Listed below are Italian people of note, who are identified with the Italian nation through residential, legal, historical, or cultural means, grouped by their area of notability.

Acting

Actors 

 Stefano Accorsi (born 1971), actor, known for Jack Frusciante è uscito dal gruppo (1995)
Henry Armetta (1888–1945), character actor who appeared in at least 150 American films, beginning in silent movies
 Roberto Benigni (born 1952), actor, comedian, screenwriter, director, known outside of Italy for directing and acting in the 1997 tragicomedy Life is Beautiful, for which he won the 1999 Oscar for Best Actor
Rossano Brazzi (1916–1994), actor. Was propelled to international fame with his role in the English-language film Three Coins in the Fountain (1954), followed by the leading male role in David Lean's Summertime (1955), opposite Katharine Hepburn.
Lando Buzzanca (born 1935), theatrical, film and television actor, whose career spanned over 55 years
Mario Carotenuto (1916–1995), actor of film and theatre. In 1973 won the Nastro d'argento for best Supporting Actor for the film Lo scopone scientifico 
 Nino Castelnuovo (1936–2021), actor. Most famous for playing opposite Catherine Deneuve in the 1964 film Les Parapluies de Cherbourg {The Umbrellas of Cherbourg} and in Italy, for his lead performance in the popular 1967 RAI TV mini-series I Promessi Sposi.
 Tino Caspanello (born 1983), actor, playwright, director, and set designer
Adolfo Celi (1922–1986), actor and director. appeared in nearly 100 films, specialising in international villains. He is best remembered internationally for his portrayal of Emilio Largo in the 1965 James Bond film Thunderball.
 Gino Cervi (1901–1974), actor and manager, known outside of Italy for his film portrayal of a small-town Communist mayor in the Don Camillo films
Walter Chiari (1924–1991), stage and screen actor, mostly in comedy roles 
 Eduardo De Filippo (1900–1984), playwright and actor. In his scores of plays he combined pathos and farce
 Manuel De Peppe (born 1970), actor, singer, arranger, music producer, composer, pianist, drummer
 Vittorio Gassman (1922–2000), film and theatre actor and director
 Elio Germano (born 1980), actor who won the Best Actor Award at the Cannes Film Festival in 2010
 Giancarlo Giannini (born 1942), actor and dubber, known for his powerful leads in Lina Wertmüller films, controversial tragicomedies that deal with sex and politics
 Terence Hill (born 1939), actor, who became famous for playing in Italian western movies (also called Spaghetti Westerns) together with his friend and partner Bud Spencer
 Nino Manfredi (1921–2004), actor, one of the most prominent in the commedia all'italiana genre
 Marcello Mastroianni (1924–1996), actor who became the preeminent leading man in Italian cinema during the 1960s. He acted in more than 100 movies
 Amedeo Nazzari (1907–1979), actor. Long and distinguished movie career, spanning four decades and including over 100 films
 Alberto Sordi (1920–2003), actor. Depicted the vices, virtues, and foibles of post-World War II Italy in a long career of mostly comic films and is regarded as a national icon
Giorgio Strehler (1921–1997), actor and theatre director. Founder of the Piccolo Teatro di Milano 
 Ugo Tognazzi (1922–1990), film and theatre actor
 Totò (1898–1967) (Antonio de Curtis), actor. Likened by international film critics to the American film comic Buster Keaton
 Massimo Troisi (1953–1994), actor and director. Internationally, known for co-starring in Il Postino (1994)
 Rudolph Valentino (1895–1926), actor, was idolized as the "Great Lover" of the 1920s
Raf Vallone (1916–2002), actor, footballer, and journalist. One of the top Italian male stars of the 1950s and 1960s, he first became known for his association with the neorealist movement. His performance in Sidney Lumet's 1962 film adaptation of A View from the Bridge won him the David di Donatello for Best Actor.
 Carlo Verdone (born 1950), actor, screenwriter and film director, specialized in comedies
 Gian Maria Volonté (1933–1994), actor. Known outside of Italy for his roles in A Fistful of Dollars (1964) and For a Few Dollars More (1965)
Luca Zingaretti (born 1961), actor and film director, known for playing Salvo Montalbano in the Inspector Montalbano series based on the character and novels created by Andrea Camilleri.

Actresses 

Marta Abba (1900–1988) actress, was considered as the muse of the playwright Luigi Pirandello
Pier Angeli (1932–1971), television and film actress who starred in American, British and European films. In 1951 she won a Golden Globe Award for Young Star of the Year -
Laura Antonelli (1941–2015), actress, who appeared in 45 films between 1964 and 1991
Francesca Bertini, actress. She was one of the most successful silent film stars in the first quarter of the twentieth-century
Nicoletta Braschi (born in 1960), actress and producer, best known for her work with her husband, actor and director Roberto Benigni
 Clara Calamai (1909–1998), actress. She is most remembered as the actress playing Carlo's mother, female lead in Luchino Visconti's Ossessione (1943)
 Claudia Cardinale (born 1938), actress. Her films include 8½ (1963) and Once Upon a Time in the West (1968)
Valentina Cortese (1923–2019), actress nominated for the Academy Award for Best Supporting Actress for her performance in François Truffaut's Day for Night (1973)
 Eleonora Duse (1858–1924), the most fluent and expressive actress of her day, she was especially noted for her roles in Henrik Ibsen's plays
 Virna Lisi (1936–2014), one of the most famous Italian actresses. She has won Cannes and César awards.
 Gina Lollobrigida (born 1927), actress. One of the first European sex symbols to emerge from the rubble of World War II
 Sophia Loren (born 1934), actress. Her performance as Cesira in the film Two Women (1961) directed by Vittorio De Sica won her the Academy Award for Best Actress, making her the first actor to win an Oscar for a non-English-language performance 
 Anna Magnani (1908–1973), actress. In the United States, she was nominated twice for an Academy Award for best actress, winning the Oscar in 1955 for her role in The Rose Tattoo
 Silvana Mangano (1930–1989), actress, known for the critically acclaimed 1949 film, Bitter Rice
Elsa Martinelli (1935–2017), actress and fashion model.
Giulietta Masina (1921–1994), actress, best known for her performances of Gelsomina in La Strada film of her husband Federico Fellini
 Mariangela Melato (1941–2013), actress known for her work in Lina Wertmüller movies
 Sandra Milo (born 1933), actress. Some of her more prestigious credits include Rossellini's General della Rovere (1959) and Fellini's 8½ (1963) and Juliet of the Spirits (1965)
Wanda Osiris (1905–1994), actress, revue soubrette, and singer.
 Alida Valli (1921–2006), actress, had roles in more than 100 films. Internationally known for her turn as Anna Schmidt in The Third Man (1949)
 Monica Vitti (1931–2022), actress. Awards: three Nastro d'Argento Awards, nine David di Donatello Awards, and four Italian Golden Grails
 Monica Bellucci (born 30 September 1964), actress and fashion model
 Asia Argento (born 20 September 1975), actress, singer, model, and director
 Ornella Muti (born 9 March 1955), actress, she made her English-speaking film debut as Princess Aura in Flash Gordon in 1980. American movies she appeared in include Oscar (1991) and Once Upon a Crime (1992).
 Valeria Golino (born 22 October 1966), film and television actress. Known to English language audiences for the 1988 film Rain Man, and the Hot Shots! films. She has won the David di Donatello, Silver Ribbon, and Coppa Volpi awards.
 Chiara Caselli (born 22 December 1967), actress
Rosanna Schiaffino (1939–2009), actress. She appeared on the covers of Italian, German, French, British and American magazines.

Architects

Ancient Rome 

 Cocceius Auctus (1st century BC and 1st century AD), Roman architect during the age of Augustus (27 BC – 14 AD)
 Hyginus Gromaticus (1st and 2nd centuries AD), Roman surveyor under the reign of Trajan (98–117 AD)
 Lucius Vitruvius Cordo, Roman architect; known for his work Arco dei Gavi (built in the 1st century AD)
 Rabirius (1st and 2nd centuries AD), Roman architect active during the reign of Domitian (81–96 AD)
 Vitruvius (late 1st century BC and early 1st century AD), Roman writer, architect and engineer noted for his book De architectura (25 BC); one of the most influential works on architecture in history

Middle Ages 

 Guglielmo Agnelli (–1313), sculptor and architect. He built the campanile of the Badia a Settimo, near Florence
 Pietro Baseggio (14th century), architect and sculptor. In 1361, he was named superintendent of construction for the Doge's palace
 Bartolomeo Bon (died after 1464), sculptor and architect. Among his works may be cited the famous Gothic Ca' d'Oro (1424–1430) and the marble door of the church of Frari
 Bertolino Bragerio (active c. 1288), builder of the cathedral of Cremona.
 Jacopo Celega (d. before 30 March 1386), architect. Around 1330 he took over construction of the church of Frari
 Diotisalvi (12th century), architect. He is well known to be the original architect of Baptistry of Pisa (1152)
 Maginardo (fl. 1006–1032), architect active in the Diocese of Arezzo
 Lorenzo Maitani (c. 1275 – 1330), architect and sculptor primarily responsible for the construction and decoration of the façade of Orvieto Cathedral

Humanism and the Renaissance 
 Leon Battista Alberti (1404–1472), artist, architect and theoretician. In 1452, wrote De Re Aedificatoria; was the first architectural treatise of the Renaissance
 Galeazzo Alessi (1512–1572), architect. His main works are the church Santa Maria Assunta di Carignano (1552), the Marino Palace (started in 1557) and the Parodi Palace (1567)
 Donato Bramante (1444–1514), architect. Under the patronage of Pope Julius II, he drew up the new St. Peter's Basilica (begun 1506)
 Filippo Brunelleschi (1377–1446), architect. His major work is the dome of the Florence Cathedral (1420–36)
 Bernardo Buontalenti (c. 1531 – 1608), architect, engineer, designer, painter and inventor. He was one of the great Renaissance polymaths
 Giacomo della Porta (c. 1533 – 1602), architect whose work represents the development in style from late Mannerism to early Baroque
 Giovanni Maria Falconetto (1468–1535), architect and painter. Examples of his work include the Porta San Giovanni (1528) and the Porta Savonarola (1530), two gates to the city of Padua
 Filarete (c. 1400 – c. 1469), architect, sculptor and writer. He wrote an important treatise, Libro architettonico (1464), defending the principles of ancient architecture
 Domenico Fontana (1543–1607), architect who worked on St. Peter's Basilica and other famous buildings of Rome and Naples
 Francesco di Giorgio Martini (1439–1502), architect and theoretician. His Trattato di architettura, ingegneria e arte militare (1482) is one of the most important documents of Renaissance architectural theory
 Giacomo Andrea da Ferrara (died 1500)
 Giuliano da Maiano (c. 1432 – 1490), architect; made an important contribution to spreading the Renaissance style to Southern Italy
 Giuliano da Sangallo (c. 1443 – 1516), sculptor, architect and military engineer; designed the Church of Santa Maria delle Carceri (1485) at Prato and palaces in Florence
 Luciano Laurana (c. 1420 – 1479), principal designer of the Palazzo Ducale at Urbino and one of the main figures in 15th-century Italian architecture
 Pirro Ligorio (c. 1510 – 1583), architect, painter, antiquarian and garden designer, known for his designs for the Casina of Pio IV in the Vatican and his gardens for the Villa d'Este at Tivoli
 Michelozzo (1396–1472), architect and sculptor; designed the Palazzo Medici Riccardi in Florence, which set the standard for Renaissance palace architecture in Tuscany for the next century
 Andrea Palladio (1508–1580), architect and theoretician. His treatise I quattro libri dell’architettura (1570) made him the most influential person in the history of Western architecture
 Baldassare Peruzzi (1481–1536), architect and painter. His outstanding architectural works are the Villa Farnesina (1506–1510) and the Palazzo Massimo alle Colonne (1535) in Rome
 Antonio da Sangallo the Elder (c. 1453 – 1534), architect. He executed, under the influence of Bramante, the magnificent Church of the Madonna di San Biagio (1518–consecrated 1529)
 Antonio da Sangallo the Younger (1484–1546), architect. He designed the Palazzo Farnese in Rome (1534–46); a fortress like Florentine-style palace
 Michele Sanmicheli (1484–1559), architect, especially noted for his original treatment of military fortifications
 Jacopo Sansovino (1486–1570), sculptor and architect. His Library of St. Mark's (begun 1537) is one of the major architectural works of the 16th century
 Vincenzo Scamozzi (1552–1616), architect and theoretician, author of one of the most comprehensive Renaissance treatises, the six-volume L’Idea dell’Architettura Universale (1615)
 Sebastiano Serlio (1475–1554), architect and theoretician. He is remembered primarily for his treatise Tutte l'opere d'architettura et prospetiva (eight books, 1537–75)
 Giacomo Barozzi da Vignola (1507–1573), architect. His finest productions are the Villa Farnese, near Viterbo, for Cardinal Alessandro Farnese and Villa Giulia for Pope Julius III in Rome

Baroque 
 Francesco Borromini (1599–1667), architect. His buildings include the churches of San Carlo alle Quattro Fontane (1638–1641) and Sant'Ivo alla Sapienza (1642–1660)
 Cosimo Fanzago (1591–1678), architect and sculptor. He became the most important exponent of Baroque architecture in Naples
 Carlo Fontana (1634/1638–1714), architect. His accomplished academic style influenced important architects, such as James Gibbs, Fischer von Erlach and the German baroque architects
 Rosario Gagliardi (1698–1762), architect. He was one of the leading architects working in the Sicilian Baroque
 Guarino Guarini (1624–1683), architect. He was one of the first to analyse with perceptivity the structure of medieval architecture, in his treatise Architettura Civile (published posthumously in 1737)
 Filippo Juvarra (1678–1736), architect, draughtsman and designer. He was arguably the most gifted architect of his time in Italy, Spain and Portugal
 Baldassarre Longhena (1598–1682), architect. His masterpiece was the Church of Santa Maria della Salute (1631–1687) at the entrance to the Grand Canal in Venice
 Carlo Maderno (1556–1629), architect. His works reflect the transition from early to high baroque. From 1603, directed the construction of St. Peter's Basilica
 Pietro da Cortona (1596–1669), architect, painter and decorator. His architectural accomplishment include the Church of Santi Luca e Martina in Rome (1634)
 Carlo Rainaldi (1611–1691), architect. His masterpiece was the Church of Santa Maria in Campitelli (1663–67)
 Francesco Bartolomeo Rastrelli (1700–1771), architect who defined the high baroque style in Russia under the reigns of Anna (1730–1740) and Elizabeth Petrovna (1741–1762)
Vincenzo Sinatra (1720–1765), architect. Following the 1693 Noto earthquake, Sinatra was responsible for many of the new buildings in the new city of Noto
 Nicola Salvi (1697–1751), architect whose late Roman Baroque masterpiece is the Trevi Fountain in Rome
 Giovanni Battista Vaccarini (1702–1768), architect, worked in the Sicilian Baroque style
 Luigi Vanvitelli (1700–1773), architect. His masterpiece was the Palace of Caserta (1752–74)

Neoclassicism 
Alessandro Antonelli (1798–1888), architect, known by famous works as the Mole Antonelliana in Turin (named for him) and both the Novara Cathedral and the Basilica of St. Gaudenzio in Novara.
 Nicola Bettoli (1780–1854), architect, known as the designer of the Neo-classicist Teatro Regio of that city, for Duches Marie Louise (1821)
 Luigi Cagnola (1762–1833), architect, whose work influenced later generations of Italian architects
 Luigi Canina (1795–1856), archaeologist and architect. He was important as a protagonist of archaeologically correct Neoclassicism in Rome
 Antonio Corazzi (1792–1877), architect. He designed a number of imposing public buildings in Warsaw, the capital of Poland
 Alessandro Galilei (1691–1737), architect. He designed the façades of Basilica of St. John Lateran (1733–35) and San Giovanni dei Fiorentini (1734)
 Giacomo Leoni (1686–1746), architect, he spent most of his life in England. It is arguable that he was more influenced by than influencing British architecture
 Giuseppe Venanzio Marvuglia (1729–1814), architect. His most extraordinary building is La Favorita (Casina Cinese 1799–1802)
 Giovanni Battista Piranesi (1720–1778), engraver and architect, known for his grandiose architectural constructions
 Giacomo Quarenghi (1744–1817), architect and painter, known as the builder of numerous works in Russia during and immediately after the reign of Catherine II the Great
 Carlo Rossi (1775–1849), architect, who worked the major portion of his life in Russia
 Francesco Sabatini (1722–1797), architect, who worked in Spain
Francesco Tamburini (1846–1891), architect who designed many important architectural landmarks in Argentina.
 Faustino Trebbi (1761–1836), architect and ornamental painter
 Giuseppe Valadier (1762–1839), architect, urban planner, designer and writer. He was one of the most important exponents of international Neoclassicism in central Italy

The 1900s 
 Franco Albini (1905–1977), architect, urban planner and designer. His work was various and eclectic, and reflected the independence of Italian designs from the tyrannies of Modernist orthodoxy
 Gae Aulenti (1927–2012), architect and designer known for her contributions to the design of museums such as the Musée d'Orsay, Centre Pompidou, and the Asian Art Museum of San Francisco, as well as the restoration of Palazzo Grassi in Venice.
 Carlo Aymonino (1926–2010), architect. He received award Honorary Fellow from the American Institute of Architect in 2000. Between his works, we find: Palazzo di Giustizia (1977) and the IMA project (Progetto IMA, 1982) in Ferrara and the Colosso in Rome (1982–1984)
 Ernesto Basile (1857–1932), architect, teacher and designer. An exponent of modernism and Art Nouveau
 Mario Bellini (born 1935), architect and designer. He won eight times Compasso d'Oro and the Gold Medal of Civic Merit of the city of Milan
 Cini Boeri (1924–2020), architect and designer who won many awards and prizes (mother of Stefano below)
 Stefano Boeri (born 1956), architect and editor, founder of the research group "Multiplicity", former editor-in-chief of the magazines "Abitare" and "Domus". Boeri has recently been appointed to the 2015 Milan Expo urban consultancy in charge of developing the guidelines for the urban transformations to be implemented within the frame of the international event.
 Achille Castiglioni (1918–2002), architect and designer. He won the Compasso d'Oro, Italy's top prize for industrial design, nine times. (See also: Livio and Pier Giacomo Castiglioni)
 Giancarlo De Carlo (1919–2005), architect, member of CIAM and Team 10. Known for his works at the Free University of Urbino (1973–9 and later)
 Ignazio Gardella (1905–1999), architect, designer, race car driver and aircraft. He received numerus awards, including: the National Award for Architecture Olivetti (1955), the Golden Lion Lifetime Achievement at the Venice Biennale (1966), the titles of honorary member of the RIBA (Royal Institute of British Architects)
 Graziano Gasparini (1924–2019), architect specialised in restoring Spanish Colonial architecture, while pursuing a parallel career as an architectural historian
 Roberto Gottardi (1927–2017), architect that worked in Venezuela and Cuba
 Vittorio Gregotti (1927–2020), architect, designer and writer. Between his work, we find: Cultural Center Bélem, Lisbon (1998) and Sede Pirelli Sede Pirelli RE Bicocca in Milan (1985)
 Franca Helg (1920–1989), architect, designer, and academic.
 Adalberto Libera (1903–1963), architect. One of the most representative architects of the Italian Modern movement
 Pier Luigi Nervi (1891–1979), structural engineer and architect known for his innovative use of reinforced concrete, especially with numerous notable thin shell structures worldwide.
Alberto Meda (born 1945), Compasso d'Oro winning engineer and designer. 
 Alessandro Mendini (1931–2019), designer and architect. His work is represented in museums and private collections all over the world. He won the Compasso d'Oro (1979 and 1982)
 Giovanni Michelucci (1891–1990), architect, urban planner and engraver. A key figure in the progress and advancement of contemporary Italian architecture during the 20th century
 Carlo Mollino (1905–1973), architect, designer, race car driver and aircraft. Rinnovation of most famous work are: the Chamber of Commerce building and the new Royal Theatre in Turin
 Luigi Moretti (1907–1973), architect. One of the most important Italian architects of the 20th century
 Giovanni Muzio (1893–1982), architect. He was the most influential member of the group of Italian architects associated with the Novecento Italiano
 Marcello Piacentini (1881–1960), architect and urban theorist most closely associated with Italy's fascist government
 Renzo Piano (born 1937), architect, known for his design (with Richard Rogers) for the Centre Georges Pompidou (1971–1977) in Paris awarded by Pritzker Prize especially for the technology
 Giò Ponti (1891–1979), architect and designer associated with the development of modern architecture and modern industrial design in Italy
 Paolo Portoghesi (born 1931), architect and architectural historian. He became known as the creator of the original and significant Casa Baldi (1959) on the Via Flaminia, north of Rome
Jorge Rigamonti (1948–2008), architect migrated in Venezuela who produced national and international award-winning designs, an active architecture professor for over 30 years
Ernesto Nathan Rogers (1909–1969), architect and theoretician. Partner BBPR architecture studio. (Cousin of architect Richard Rogers)
Richard Rogers (1933–2021, architect noted for his modernist and functionalist designs in high-tech architecture
 Aldo Rossi (1931–1997), architect and theoretician. His book The Architecture of the City (1966) is a classic of modern architectural theory. He was awarded the 1990 Pritzker Prize
 Giuseppe Samonà (1898–1983), architect and urban planner. One of the most important Italian architects of the 20th century
 Antonio Sant'Elia (1888–1916), architect. Associated with the movement known as Futurism; known for his visionary drawings of the city of the future
 Carlo Scarpa (1906–1978), architect. Among his works may be cited the Palazzo Foscari (1935–1956) and Castelvecchio Museum (1956–1964)
 Ettore Sottsass (1917–2007), architect and designer. He is internationally known as one of the initiators of the renewal of design and architecture
 Manfredo Tafuri (1935–1994), architect, art historian and theorist. Known for his critical essays for Oppositions magazine (1970), published under the guidance of Peter Eisenman
 Giuseppe Terragni (1904–1943), architect associated with Rationalism and Gruppo 7. His Casa del Fascio (1932–6) is regarded as his finest work
 Paolo Venini (1895–1959), one of the leading figures in the production of Murano glass and an important contributor to twentieth century Italian design.
 Lella and Massimo Vignelli (1934–2016 and 1934–2014 respectively), architects and designers know for packaging, houseware, furniture, public signage, and showroom design.
 Marco Zanuso (1916–2001), leading modernist architect and designer.
 Bruno Zevi (1918–2000), architect, historian, professor, curator, author, and editor. Zevi was a vocal critic of "classicizing" modern architecture and postmodernism.

Chefs and gastronomists 

 Pellegrino Artusi (1820–1911), writer and gastronomist, credited with establishing a truly national Italian cuisine. His La scienza in cucina e l'arte di mangiare bene (1891) was the first gastronomic treatise comprising all regions of united Italy
Caesar Cardini creator of the Caesar salad
 Martino da Como (c. 1430–late 15th century), "Prince of cooks", considered the western world's first celebrity chef. His book Libro de Arte Coquinaria (1465) was a benchmark for Italian cuisine and laid the ground for European gastronomic tradition
 Carlo Petrini (born 1949), politician, writer and gastronomist. Taking part in a campaign against the McDonald's chain and a busy daily routine, he founded the worldwide influential Slow Food movement in 1986.
Sirio Maccioni (1932–2020), restaurateur and author known for opening Le Cirque of New York
 Luisa Marelli Valazza (born 1950), three-star Michelin chef

Craftsmen
 Cesare Antonio Accius (fl.1609), engraver
Nicola Amati (1596–1684), Master Luthier and a craftsman of string instruments
 Pagolo Arsago (died 1563), goldsmith
 Sebastiano Bianchi (fl.1580), engraver
Carlo Mario Camusso (died 1956), silversmith migrated in Peru
 Alessandro della Via (fl.1730), engraver
Battista Farina (1893–1966), automobile designer and the founder of the Carrozzeria Pininfarina coachbuilding company, a name associated with many well known postwar cars
 Baldassare Gabbugiani (fl.1755), engraver
Giorgetto Giugiaro (born 1938), automotive designer. In 1999 Giugiaro was named Car Designer of the Century and inducted into the Automotive Hall of Fame in 2002.
Matteo Goffriller (1659–1742), Master luthier, particularly noted for the quality of his cellos. He was the founder of the "Venetian School" of luthiers
Giuseppe Guarneri (1698 – 1744), Master luthier from the Guarneri family of Cremona. He rivals Antonio Stradivari (1644–1737)
Ferruccio Lamborghini (1916–1993), automobile designer, inventor, engineer, winemaker, industrialist and businessman who created In 1963, Automobili Lamborghini, a maker of high-end sports cars 
Flavio Manzoni (born 1965), architect and automobile designer, Senior Vice President of Design at Ferrari from 2010
Sergio Scaglietti (1920–2011), automobile designer
Antonio Stradivari (1644–1737), Master Luthier and a craftsman of string instruments
Massimo Tamburini (1943–2014), motorcycle designer for Cagiva, Ducati, and MV Agusta. His designs are iconics and critics calling him the "Michelangelo of motorbike design"
 Bartolommeo Tutiani (fl. 1515), engraver
 Antonio Zabelli (1742–1796), engraver

Engineers 

 Giovanni Battista Antonelli (1527–1588), military engineer. His most important works was a series of watchtowers along the coast of Mediterranean Sea in Spain
 Battista Antonelli, military engineer designed the major fortress of the Spanish Empire in the New World
Father Eugenio Barsanti (1821–1864), engineer, who together with Felice Matteucci of Lucca invented the first version of the internal combustion engine in 1853
 Enrico Bernardi (1841–1919), engineer and one of Italian automobile pioneers. Inventor of the "Pia Engine", the first petrol engine
 Alfonso Bialetti (1888–1970), engineer who became famous for the invention of the Moka Express coffeemaker
Giuseppe Mario Bellanca (1886–1960), engineer who was an aviation pioneer, airplane designer and builder 
Enea Bossi Sr. (1888–1963), aerospace engineer and aviation pioneer. He is best known for designing the Budd BB-1 Pioneer, the first stainless steel aircraft; and the Pedaliante airplane,
 Giovanni Branca (1571–1645), engineer and architect who provided the first known description of a steam turbine (1629)
Tito Livio Burattini (1617–1681), engineer, inventor, architect, Egyptologist, scientist, instrument-maker, traveller, and nobleman, who spent his working life in Poland and Lithuania
 Matteo Campani-Alimenis (1620–1678), engineer, mechanician and natural philosopher. Inventor of the Magic lantern (1678)
 Secondo Campini (1904–1980), engineer, one of the pioneers of the jet engine
 Alessandro Capra (born 1620, date of death unknown), engineer and mathematician. Inventor of the first speedometer for coaches (1678)
 Giovanni Battista Caproni (1886–1957), aeronautical engineer, civil engineer, electrical engineer, and aircraft designer who founded an aircraft-manufacturing company bearing his name (1908)
 Giorgio Carta, bioengineer, professor of chemical engineering
 Mario Castoldi (1888–1968), aeronautical engineer who designed the renown Macchi MC.200, Macchi MC.202 and Macchi MC.205 World War II Italian fighter airplanes
 Bernard Castro (1904–1991), industrial engineer. Inventor of the modern convertible couch
 Leonardo Chiariglione (born 1943), electrical engineer, inventor and co-founder of the Moving Pictures Experts Group (MPEG). He led a team that set the universal standards for digital audio and video, such as the mpeg and the mp3
 Aldo Costa (born 1961), engineer and engineering director; his 14 constructors' championships and 12 drivers' titles with Ferrari and Mercedes make him the most successful engineer and designer in F1 history
Mario Masciulli (1909–1991), military engineer of the Italian Regia Marina, director of the Office of Submarine Secret Weapons during II World War. He was awarded the Silver Medal of Military Valor.
 Luigi Negrelli (1799–1858), civil and hydraulic engineer; designed several bridges and railways in the Austrian Empire and well beyond, known for planning and designing the Suez Canal.
 Maria Artini (1894–1951), first female university graduate in electrical engineering in Italy (1918)
 Corradino D'Ascanio (1891–1981), aeronautical engineer. Inventor of motor scooter (Vespa in 1946)
 Luigi Emanueli (1883–1959), engineer. Inventor of oil-filled cable (1924)
 Lorenzo Allievi (1856–1941), hydraulic engineer, best known for his studies on the water hammer problem
 Federico Faggin (born 1941), physicist, engineer, credited with developing the Self Aligned MOS Silicon Gate Technology, co-invented and designed the world's first microprocessor, the Intel 4004 (1970–1971)
 Enrico Forlanini (1848–1930), engineer and aeronautical pioneer. Inventor of the helicopter (1877) and hydrofoil (1900)
 Francesco Lana de Terzi (1631–1687), Jesuit, mathematician, and naturalist. Called the father of aeronautics for his pioneering efforts
 Leonardo da Vinci (1452–1519), artist, engineer, and scientist. Perhaps no one in history achieved so much in so many different fields
 Vincenzo Lancia (1881–1937), racing driver, engineer and founder of Lancia car maker firm.
 Giovanni Luppis (1813–1875), engineer and officer, co-inventor with Robert Whitehead, of the torpedo (1860)
Alfieri Maserati (1887–1932), automotive engineer, known for establishing and leading the Maserati racing car manufacturer with the other Maserati Brothers.
 Giorgina Madìa (1904–1942), physicist and electrical engineer, specializing in electrical communications, and a member of the Italian resistance during World War II
 Felice Matteucci (1808–1887), hydraulic engineer, co-inventor with Eugenio Barsanti, of the internal combustion engine (1854)
 Antonio Meucci (1808–1889), chemical and mechanical engineer. Inventor of the telephone (1871)
 Riccardo Morandi (1902–1989), engineer. He designed the Ponte Vespucci in Florence, the General Rafael Urdaneta Bridge in Venezuela, the Ponte Morandi in Genoa, and the Salone dell'Automobile in Turin
 Pier Luigi Nervi (1891–1979) engineer, specialized in civil. He collaborated with international architects, including Le Corbusier e Louis Kahn. His most famous work: Aula delle Udienze Pontificie in Vaticano, known as Aula Nervi
 Camillo Olivetti (1868–1943), electrical engineer, founder of Olivetti
 Pier Giorgio Perotto (1930–2002), electrical engineer and inventor, working for Olivetti he designed and built one of the world"s first electronic programmable calculators, the Programma 101, launched at the 1964 New York World's Fair
 Giovanni Battista Piatti (1812–1867), civil engineer. Inventor of the pneumatic rock-drilling machine
 Giovanni Battista Pirelli (1848–1932), entrepreneur, engineer and politician, founder of rubber company Pirelli based in Milan.
 Ignazio Porro (1801–1875), engineer and optician, invented Porro prism binocular (1875)
 Adele Racheli (1897–1992), engineer, co-founder of Milan patent protection office (1925).
 Agostino Ramelli (1531–1600), engineer, invented the hydraulic motor (1588)
 Nicola Romeo (1876–1938), engineer and entrepreneur mostly known for founding the car manufacturer Alfa Romeo. 
 Raffaele Rossetti (1881–1951), engineer and military naval officer, creator of the first human torpedo
 Germain Sommeiller (1815–1871), civil engineer. He directed the construction of the Fréjus Rail Tunnel between France and Italy; introduced the first industrial pneumatic drill for tunnel digging
 Emma Strada (1884–1970), first woman to obtain a civil engineering degree from the Polytechnic of Turin
 Juanelo Turriano (c. 1500 – 1585), clockmaker, engineer and mathematician. He built the Artificio de Juanelo
Andrea Viterbi (born 1935), electrical engineer and businessman who co-founded Qualcomm Inc. and invented the Viterbi algorithm.

Explorers 

Alberto Maria de Agostini (1883–1960), explorer of the Patagonia
 António de Noli (1415–1419–c. 1497), explorer for Portugal. Was the first European to arrive in some of the Cape Verde islands in 1460
 Giovanni Battista Belzoni (1778–1823), explorer, engineer, and amateur archaeologist, often regarded as one of the first Egyptologists
 John Cabot (Giovanni Caboto) (c. 1450 – c. 1499), explorer for England. In the summer of 1497, he crossed the Atlantic and was the first European to arrive in the mainland of North America
 Sebastian Cabot (Sebastiano Caboto) (c. 1476 – 1557), cartographer and explorer for England and Spain, he explored the Río de la Plata, the Paraná River and was the person European to arrive in the lower section of the Paraguay River.
Gaetano Casati (1838–1902), explorer of Africa
 Christopher Columbus (Cristoforo Colombo) (1451–1506), explorer for Spain. Born in Genua. In Italian language "Cristoforo Colombo". Sailed in 1492 and was the first European to arrive in the "New World" of the Americas
Niccolò de' Conti (c. 1395–1469), merchant and explorer of India
 Henri de Tonti (1649/1650–1704), explorer for France. Founded the first European settlement in the lower Mississippi River Valley in 1686
 Giovanni da Pian del Carpine (c. 1180 – 1252), Franciscan friar, first noteworthy European traveller in the Mongol Empire
 Giovanni da Verrazzano (1485–1528), explorer for France. First European to sight New York and Narragansett bays
 Alessandro Malaspina (1754–1810), nobleman who spent most of his life as a Spanish naval officer and explorer
 Umberto Nobile (1885–1978), engineer and Arctic explorer. The first man to fly over the North Pole
Giovanni Battista Pastene (1507-!590),  maritime explorer. He was among the first to explore the Pacific in the sixteenth century ordered by Emperor Charles V
 Antonio Pigafetta (c. 1491 – c. 1534), navigator and writer who accompanied Magellan in the first expedition of circumnavigation of the world
Filippo Salvatore Gilii (1721–1789), Jesuit priest who explored the basin of Orinoco River. Gilii is a highly celebrated figure in early South American linguistics due to his advanced insights into the nature of languages
 Marco Polo (c. 1254 – 1324), explorer and merchant, famous for his travels in central Asia and China
 Matteo Ricci (1552–1610), Italian Jesuit priest and one of the founding figures of the Jesuit China Mission
 Pierre Savorgnan de Brazza (1852–1905), explorer for France. Famous for having added an area three times the size of France to the French empire in Africa
 Amerigo Vespucci (1454–1512), explorer. Was the first European to arrive at the Amazon river in South America. The name for the Americas is derived from his given name
 Romolo Gessi (1831–1881), explorer and soldier. He led numerous expeditions for the British in Africa, especially Sudan and the Nile River, freeing 30,000 slaves from bondage

Fictional characters

Filmmakers 

 Filoteo Alberini (1865–1937), film director, one of the pioneers of cinema; devised the wide screen movies (1914)
 Gianni Amelio (born 1945), film director. He achieved international fame with The Stolen Children (winner of the Grand Jury Prize at the 1992 Cannes Film Festival)
 Michelangelo Antonioni (1912–2007), film director. His most successful motion pictures internationally were L'avventura (1960) and Blow-up (1966)
 Dario Argento (born 1940), film director, producer and screenwriter. Films include The Bird with the Crystal Plumage (1970), Deep Red (1975) and Suspiria (1977)
 Pupi Avati (born 1938), film director, producer and screenwriter. Some of his most successful films were Impiegati (1985), Christmas Present (1986) and The Last Minute (1987)
 Marco Bellocchio (born 1939), film director, screenwriter and actor. Known for his debut film Fists in the Pocket (1965)
 Roberto Benigni (born 1952), film director and actor. One of the most popular comics of Italian cinema; in 1997 he wrote, directed and starred in the international hit Life is Beautiful
 Bernardo Bertolucci (1940–2018), film director and screenwriter. Last Tango in Paris (1972) brought him international fame
 Alessandro Blasetti (1900–1987), film director and screenwriter  was one of the leading figures in Italian cinema during the Fascist era. He is sometimes known as the "father of Italian cinema" because of his role in reviving the struggling industry in the late 1920s. Blasetti influenced Italian neorealism with the film Quattro passi fra le nuvole.
 Frank Capra (1897–1991), film director, producer and writer who became the creative force behind some of the major award-winning films of the 1930s and 1940s. 
 Luigi Comencini (1916–2007), film director. Leading figure in Italian cinema; known for his film Bread, Love and Dreams (1953)
 Giuseppe De Santis (1917–1997), film director; known for his direction of Bitter Rice (1949), considered the first successful Neorealist film
 Vittorio De Seta (1923–2011), film director. He made nine such short documentaries over the decade and in 1960 made his feature film directorial debut with the acclaimed Banditi a Orgosolo
 Vittorio De Sica (1901–1974), film director and actor. His Shoeshine (1946), The Bicycle Thief (1948), and Umberto D. (1952) are classics of postwar Italian neorealism
 Ruggero Deodato (born 1939), film director, actor and screenwriter. Creator of one of the most infamous splatter films of all time, 1979's neo-realist Amazonian nightmare Cannibal Holocaust
 Federico Fellini (1920–1993), film director. Won Oscars for La Strada (1954), Le Notti di Cabiria (1957), 8 1/2 (1963) and Amarcord (1973); one of the 20th century's most influential movie directors
 Marco Ferreri (1928–1997), film director. known film is La Grande Bouffe (1973).
 Lucio Fulci (1927–1996), film director, screenwriter and actor, known for his directorial work on gore films, including Zombi 2 (1979) and The Beyond (1981).
 Matteo Garrone (born 1968), film director; known for his film Gomorrah (2008)
 Pietro Germi (1914–1974), film director and actor. The film Divorce Italian Style (1961) was a huge worldwide box-office hit which earned him an Oscar for best screenplay
 Alberto Lattuada (1914–2005), film director. Was a major figure in Italian cinema of the period after World War II. Known for co-directing with Fellini on his first film, Variety Lights (1950)
 Sergio Leone (1929–1989), film director. He is mostly associated with the "Spaghetti Western" genre, especially the dollar trilogy; one of the most influential directors of his generation
 Mario Monicelli (1915–2010), film director. One of the masters of the Commedia all'Italiana
 Nanni Moretti (born 1953), film director. He is known for his films Caro diario (1993) and The Son's Room (2001)
 Ermanno Olmi (1931–2018), film director; known for his internationally successful The Tree of Wooden Clogs (1978)
 Ferzan Özpetek (born 1959), film director and screenwriter. Film include The Ignorant Fairies (2001) and Facing Windows (2003)
 Pier Paolo Pasolini (1922–1975), film director and writer. His films include Mamma Roma (1962), The Gospel According to St. Matthew (1964), Oedipus Rex (1967) and Teorema (1968)
 Giovanni Pastrone (1883–1959), film director and producer. He conceived a colossal film designed to revolutionize movie-making, a goal he realized with Cabiria (1914)
 Elio Petri (1929–1982), film director and screenwriter. Investigation of a Citizen Above Suspicion (1970), is generally considered his masterpiece
 Gillo Pontecorvo (1919–2006), film director; known for authoring The Battle of Algiers (1966)
 Francesco Rosi (1922–2015), film director; known for his masterpiece Salvatore Giuliano (1962)
 Roberto Rossellini (1906–1977), film director. His films Rome, Open City (1945) and Paisà (1946) focussed international attention on the Italian Neorealist movement in films
 Gabriele Salvatores (born 1950), film director and screenwriter; known for his film Mediterraneo (1991)
 Martin Scorsese (born 1942), film director known for directing films such as Goodfellas (1990) and various other gangster films.
 Michele Soavi (born 1957), film director; known for his film Cemetery Man (1994)
 Silvio Soldini (born 1958), film director, known films we find Bread and Tulips (1999) and Agata e la tempesta (2004)
 Paolo Sorrentino (born 1970), film director and screenwriter. He is known for his film The Consequences of Love (2004)
 Paolo and Vittorio Taviani (born 1931, 1929–2018), have directed together several successful movies. Among those are: Padre Padrone (1977), The Night of the Shooting Stars (1982) and Kaos (1984)
 Giuseppe Tornatore (born 1956), film director, known for his masterpiece Cinema Paradiso (1988)
 Luchino Visconti (1906–1976), film and theatre director; called the father of neorealism for his early films Ossessione (1943) and La terra trema (1948)
 Lina Wertmüller (1928–2021), film director. She achieved international fame with The Seduction of Mimi (1972), a satire on sexual hypocrisy, and Love and Anarchy (1973)
 Franco Zeffirelli (1923–2019), film director. Among his major films are three Shakespeare adaptations: The Taming of the Shrew (1967), Romeo and Juliet (1968) and Hamlet (1990)
 Valerio Zurlini (1926–1982), film director, stage director and screenwriter. He is well known for his internationally successful Estate Violenta (1959)

Illustrators 

 Leonetto Cappiello (1875–1942), poster art designer. He has been called the father of modern advertising
 Adolfo de Carolis (1874–1928), painter, illustrator and wood-engraver
 Onofrio Catacchio (born 1964), cartoonist
 Max Crivello (born 1958), illustrator and cartoonist
 Gabriele Dell'Otto (born 1973), illustrator and author whose works have been published around the world
 Franco Donatelli (1924–1995), comic artist and illustrator
 Virginio Livraghi, comic strip illustrator
 Enrico Mazzanti (1850–1910), engineer and cartoonist, who illustrated the first edition of Pinocchio
 Bartolomeo Pinelli (1781–1835), illustrator and engraver. He illustrated in his figures the costumes of the Italian peoples, the great epic poems and numerous other subjects
 Maria Zacchè (born 1933), illustrator

Military and political figures

Etruscan civilization 

 Mezentius, legendary Etruscan king who reigned at Caere and fought against Aeneas
 Lars Porsena (6th century BC), legendary Etruscan king, alleged to have besieged Rome in a vain attempt to reinstate Lucius Tarquinius Superbus on the throne
 Lars Tolumnius (died 428 BC), the most famous king of the wealthy Etruscan city-state of Veii

Ancient Rome 
Agrippa Menenius Lanatus (died 493 BC), consul of the Roman Republic in 503 BC, with Publius Postumius Tubertus. Victorious over the Sabines and was awarded a triumph which he celebrated on 4 April, 503 BC.

 Scipio Aemilianus (185 BC–129 BC), Roman general famed both for his exploits during the Third Punic War (149–146 BC) and for his subjugation of Spain (134–133 BC)
 Caligula (31 August 12–24 January 41 AD) was Roman emperor from 37 to 41 AD. Was widely considered to be one of Rome's most cruelest and sadistic emperors ever to rule
 Marcus Aemilius Lepidus (c. 89 or 88 BC–late 13 or early 12 BC), Roman statesman, one of the triumvirs who ruled Rome after 43 BC
 Lucius Aemilius Paullus Macedonicus (c. 229 BC–160 BC), Roman general whose victory over the Macedonians at Pydna ended the Third Macedonian War (171–168 BC)
 Publius Cornelius Scipio (c. 255 BC-211 BC), Roman general and statesman of the Roman Republic and the father of Scipio Africanus. 
 Nero (15 December 37–9 June 68 AD) The last emperor of the Julio-Claudian Dynasty and is believed to be responsible for the burning of Rome
 Mark Antony (83 BC–30 BC), Roman politician and general
 Romulus and Remus (c. mid to late 8th century BC), Romulus was the first king of the Roman Kingdom
 Marcus Atilius Regulus (fl. 3rd century BC), Roman general and statesman
 Augustus (63 BC–AD 14), first and among the most important of the Roman Emperors. One of the great administrative geniuses of history
Publius Quinctilius Varus (46 BC – AD 9), Roman general and politician. Varus is generally remembered for having lost three Roman legions when ambushed by Germanic tribes led by Arminius in the Battle of the Teutoburg Forest, whereupon he took his own life.
 Marcus Aurelius (121–180), Roman emperor, has symbolized for many generations in the West the Golden Age of the Roman Empire
 Lucius Junius Brutus (545 BC–509 BC), Roman consul, traditional founder of the Roman Republic
 Marcus Junius Brutus (85 BC–42 BC), Roman politician, leader of the conspirators who assassinated Julius Caesar (44 BC)
 Julius Caesar (100 BC–44 BC), Roman statesman and general, famous for the conquest of Gaul. A figure of genius and audacity equaled by few in history
 Marcus Furius Camillus (c. 446 BC–365 BC), Roman soldier and statesman
 Catiline (108 BC–62 BC), Roman politician
 Tiberius (16 November 42 BC–16 March 37 AD), second Roman emperor, succeeding Augustus
 Cato the Elder (234 BC–149 BC), Roman statesman, orator and the first Latin prose writer of importance
 Cato the Younger (95 BC–46 BC), Roman politician and statesman in the late Roman Republic
 Cicero (106 BC–43 BC), Roman statesman, scholar, writer and orator.
 Cincinnatus (519 BC–438 BC), Roman politician
 Appius Claudius Caecus (fl. 3rd century BC), outstanding statesman, legal expert, and author of early Rome
 Marcus Claudius Marcellus (c. 268 BC–208 BC), Roman general who captured Syracuse during the Second Punic War (218–201)
Publius Cornelius Scipio Africanus (236/235 BC–183 BC), general and statesman, most notable as one of the main architects of Rome's victory against Carthage in the Second Punic War.One of the great military minds of all times
 Publius Clodius Pulcher (c. 93 BC–52 BC), disruptive politician, head of a band of political thugs, and bitter enemy of Cicero in late republican Rome
 Lucius Cornelius Scipio Barbatus (?–c. 280 BC), consul in 298 BC. He defeated the Etruscans at Volaterrae and afterwards fought against the Samnites
 Lucius Cornelius Sulla (c. 138 BC–78 BC), Roman general and statesman
 Manius Curius Dentatus (?–270 BC), Roman general. As consul led the Romans to victory over the Samnites and defeated Pyrrhus of Epirus near Beneventum (275 BC)
 Gaius Duilius (fl. 3rd century BC), Roman commander who won a major naval victory over the Carthaginians during the First Punic War (264–241 BC)
 Germanicus (15 BC–AD 19), Roman general who avenged the defeat sustained by Varus (AD 9), defeating Arminius at Idistaviso on the Weser (AD 16)
 Gaius Gracchus (154 BC–121 BC), Roman politician
 Marcus Licinius Crassus (c. 115 BC–53 BC), Roman general and politician
 Lucullus (c. 117 BC–57/56 BC), Roman general who fought Mithradates VI Eupator of Pontus from 74 to 66 BC
 Gaius Maecenas (70 BC–8 BC), Roman diplomat, counsellor to the Roman emperor Augustus
 Gaius Marius (157 BC–86 BC), Roman general and politician
 Quintus Fabius Maximus Verrucosus (c. 280 BC–203 BC), Roman politician and general, famous for having invented the guerrilla warfare (method of combat in 217 BC)
 Lucius Aemilius Paullus Macedonicus (c. 229 BC–160 BC), Roman general whose victory over the Macedonians at Pydna ended the Third Macedonian War (171–168 BC)
 Pontius Pilate (16 BC–AD 36), Roman politician, famous primarily as a crucial character in the New Testament account of Jesus
 Antoninus Pius (86–161), Roman emperor, mild-mannered and capable, he was the fourth of the five good emperors"
 Pompey (106 BC–48 BC), Roman military and political leader of the late Roman Republic
 Lucius Tarquinius Superbus (535 BC-509 BC), King of Rome famed for his resistance against the people trying to found the Roman Republic
 Trajan (53–117), Emperor who presided over the greatest expansion in Roman history. He was born in Italica, a colony of Italian settlers in Hispania, and his family was from Umbria
 Titus Quinctius Flamininus (c. 229 BC–174 BC), Roman general and statesman who established the Roman hegemony over Greece
 Quintus Sertorius (c. 126 BC–73 BC), one of the most able Roman generals, who displayed a particular genius for leading armies of irregulars
 Marcus Vipsanius Agrippa (63 BC–12 BC), Roman statesman and general; he was long honored by the Roman military as the inventor of the Harpax
 Gaius Ofonius Tigellinus (c. 10–69), prefect of the Roman Imperial bodyguard, known as the Praetorian Guard, from 62 until 68, during the reign of Emperor Nero.
Flavius Aetius (391–454), military commander and the most influential man in the Roman Empire for two decades (433–454). He was called as The Last Roman

Roman Catholic Church 

 Pope Adrian I (c. 700–795), pope from 772 to 795; his pontificate was unequalled in length by that of any successor of Saint Peter until a thousand years later
 Pope Agapetus I (?–536), of noble birth, he was an archdeacon at the time of his election (13 May 535)
 Pope Alexander III (c. 1100/1105–1181), pope from 1159 to 1181. He is remembered for the long-standing dispute with the Holy Roman Emperor Frederick I
 Ambrose (337 or 340–397), bishop of Milan; one of the most influential ecclesiastical figures of the 4th century; he was also the teacher of Saint Augustine
 Augustine of Canterbury (?–604), Benedictine monk and the first Archbishop of Canterbury. He is considered the "Apostle to the English" and a founder of the English Church
 Benedict of Nursia (c. 480 – c. 547), father of Western monasticism; the rule that he established became the norm for monastic living throughout Europe
 Pope Benedict V (?–966), pope, or antipope, from 22 May 964, to 23 June 964, when he was deposed
 Pope Boniface VIII (c. 1235 – 1303), issued in 1302, the famous bull Unam sanctam (pushing papal supremacy to its historical extreme)
 Pope Celestine I (?–432), pope from 422 to 432
 Pope Celestine V (1215–1296), pope from 5 July to 13 December 1294, the first pontiff to abdicate. He founded the Celestine order
 Peter Damian (c. 1007 – 1072), cardinal and Doctor of the Church. He was an original leader and a forceful figure in the Gregorian Reform movement
 Pope Gregory I (c. 540–604), founder" of the medieval papacy, which exercised both secular and spiritual power; he is considered one of the great Latin Fathers of the Church
 Pope Gregory II (669–731), greatly encouraged the Christianizing of Germany by SS; the Donation of Sutri (728) is considered the constitutive act of the Papal States
 Pope Gregory VII (c. 1015/1028–1085), one of the great reforming popes; known for the part he played in the Investiture Controversy
 John Gualbert (985 or 995–1073), Roman Catholic saint. The founder of the Vallumbrosan Order
 Pope Honorius I (?–638), pope from 625 to 638 whose posthumous condemnation as a heretic subsequently caused extensive controversy on the question of papal infallibility
 Pope Honorius III (?–1227), often considered one of the great administrators in papal history
 Pope Innocent III (1160–1216), during his reign, the papacy was at the height of its powers
 Pope John II (?–535), pope from 533 to 535. He was the first pontiff to change his original name, which he considered pagan, assuming the name of the martyred Saint John I (523–526)
 Pope John VIII (?–?), often considered one of the ablest pontiffs of the 9th century
 Pope John XIX (?–1032), pope from 1024 to 1032
Pope Julius II (1443–1513), pope from 1503 to 1513. Nicknamed the Warrior Pope or the Fearsome Pope, he chose his papal name not in honour of Pope Julius I but in emulation of Julius Caesar.
 Pope Leo I (c. 400–461), pope from 440 to 461, master exponent of papal supremacy
 Pope Leo III (750–816), known for crowning Charlemagne as the first Holy Roman Emperor
 Pope Liberius (?–366), pope from 352 to 366
 Matilda of Tuscany (1046–1115), noblewoman. She was a strong supporter of the papacy during the Investiture Controversy
 Pope Nicholas I (c. 800–867), pope from 858 to 867, master theorist of papal power, considered to have been the most forceful of the early medieval pontiffs
 Paulinus of Nola (353–431), bishop of Nola and one of the most important Christian Latin poets of his time. He is also the inventor of church bells
 Romuald (c. 950–1025–1027), Christian ascetic who founded the Camaldolese Benedictines (Hermits)
 Pope Sergius I (?–701), pope from 687 to 701, one of the most important 7th-century pontiffs
 Pope Stephen II (715–757), pope from 752 to 757. He severed ties with the Byzantine Empire and thus became the first temporal sovereign of the newly founded Papal States
 Pope Sylvester I (?–335), one of the most illustrious popes of his age; after his death, became a major figure of legend
 Pope Symmachus (?–514), pope from 498 to 514
 Rainerius Saccho, 13th century Inquisitor

Renaissance 

 Alessandro de' Medici, Duke of Florence (1510–1537), the first duke of Florence (1532–37)
 Catherine de' Medici (1519–1589), Queen of France
 Cosimo de' Medici (1389–1464), founder of the Medici political dynasty
 Cosimo I de' Medici, Grand Duke of Tuscany (1519–1574), second duke of Florence (1537–74) and first grand duke of Tuscany (1569–74)
 Ferdinando I de' Medici, Grand Duke of Tuscany (1549–1609), grand duke of Tuscany from 1587 to 1609
 Francesco I de' Medici, Grand Duke of Tuscany (1541–1587), second grand duke of Tuscany, ruling from 1574 to 1587
 Giovanni di Bicci de' Medici (1360–1429), restored the family fortune and made the Medici family the wealthiest in Europe
 Lorenzo de' Medici (1449–1492), leader of Florence during the Golden Age of the Renaissance; patron of arts and letters, the most brilliant of the Medici
 Marie de' Medici (1575–1642), Queen and Regent of France who was a harsh opponent of Protestantism in France
 Salvestro de' Medici (1331–1388), Gonfaloniere and Provost of the city of Florence
 Pope Clement VII (Giulio de' Medici) (1478–1534), pope from 1523 to 1534; it was Pope Clement who excommunicated Henry VIII of England
 Pope Leo X (Giovanni de' Medici) (1475–1521), cardinal-deacon from the age of 13
 Pope Leo XI (Alessandro Ottaviano de' Medici) (1535–1605), pope from 1–27 April 1605

 Cesare Borgia (1475/1476–1507), Spanish-Italian condottiero, nobleman, politician, and cardinal. Powerful lord, and a leading figure in the politics of his era
Castruccio Castracani degli Antelminelli (1281–1328). condottiero and duke of Lucca
 Bartolomeo Colleoni (1400–1475), condottiere, at various times in Venetian and Milanese service and from 1454 general in chief of the Republic of Venice for life
 Andrea Doria (1466–1560), condottiere, and admiral who was the foremost naval leader of his time
Galeazzo da Sanseverino (1460 – 1525), condottiere and Grand Écuyer de France
 Erasmo of Narni (1370–1443, known as Gattamelata), served Florence, Venice and the pope before becoming dictator of Padua
 Frederick II, Holy Roman Emperor (1194–1250), King of Sicily and promoter of Sicilian culture and political power; expanded domain into much of Italy
 Federico da Montefeltro (1422–1482), lord of Urbino from 1444 (as Duke from 1474) until his death. He is widely regarded as one of the most successful condottieri of his time
 Giovanni dalle Bande Nere (1498–1526), the most noted soldier of all the Medici
Giovanni Giustiniani Longo (1418–1453), kinsman to the powerful house of Doria in Genoa and protostrator of the Byzantine Empire, who led the defense of Constantinople against the Ottoman army of Sultan Mehmed II in 1453. 
 Sigismondo Pandolfo Malatesta (1417–1468), condottiero and nobleman. He was widely considered by his contemporaries as one of the most daring military leaders in Italy
 Niccolò Piccinino (1386–1444), soldier of fortune who played an important role in the 15th-century wars of the Visconti of Milan against Venice, Florence, and the pope
Giovanni Dionigi Galeni (1519–1587), farmer, then Ottoman privateer and admiral, who later became beylerbey of the Regency of Algiers, and finally Grand Admiral of the Ottoman fleet
 Francesco I Sforza (1401–1466), condottiere who played a crucial role in 15th-century Italian politics
 Muzio Sforza (1369–1424), soldier of fortune who played an important role in the wars of his period and whose son Francesco became duke of Milan
 Gian Giacomo Trivulzio (1440/1441–1518), aristocrat and condottiero who served as a military captain under Galeazzo, later became the grand Marshal of France
Sebastiano Venier (c. 1496–1578), Doge of Venice from 1577 to 1578. He is best remembered in his role as the Venetian admiral at the Battle of Lepanto

Early Modern period to Unification 

 Charles Emmanuel I, Duke of Savoy (1562–1630), skilled soldier and shrewd politician. He was nicknamed Testa d'feu ("Head of Fire") for his rashness and military attitudes
Carlo Luigi Castelli (1790–1860), military and illustrious hero of the independence of Venezuela from Spanish rule
 Michelangelo Alessandro Colli-Marchi (1738–1808), general in the service of the Austrian army
 Torquato Conti (1591–1636), military commander who served as a General-Field Marshal of the Holy Roman Empire during the Thirty Years' War
 Eugene of Savoy (1663–1736), general in the service of the Austrian Holy Roman emperor
 Francesco Morosini (1619–1694), doge of Venice (1688–94), of a family distinguished in Venice for five centuries
 Alexander Farnese, Duke of Parma (1545–1592), revitalized Spanish rule in the southern provinces of the Netherlands (modern Belgium and Luxembourg)
 Achille Fontanelli (1755–1838), Minister of War and general of the Napoleonic Kingdom of Italy
 Pasquale Paoli (1725–1807), statesman and general, hailed as the father of Corsica. He wrote and promulgated the modern world's first democratic constitution in 1755
 Pietro Micca (1677–1706), the miner who at the sacrifice of his own life saved the citadel of Turin (1706) from French troops
 Francesco Morosini (1619–1694), doge of Venice (1688–94), of a family distinguished in Venice for five centuries
 Raimondo Montecuccoli (1609–1680), field marshal and military reformer. In the service of the Habsburgs, he took part in the Thirty Years' War
 Napoleon (1769–1821), Corsican military and political leader, founder and leader of the First French Empire, the Italian Republic and Kingdom
 Ottavio Piccolomini (1599–1656), general and diplomat in the service of the House of Habsburg during the Thirty Years' War
 Franziska Scanagatta (1776–1864), military officer who served the Austrian Empire.
 Ambrogio Spinola, 1st Marquis of the Balbases (1569–1630), general and master of siege warfare in the service of Spain
 Victor Amadeus II of Sardinia (1666–1732), King of Sicily (1713–1720) and of Sardinia (1720–1730), established the foundation for the future Italian national state

1861 to the rise of Fascism 

 Pietro Badoglio (1871–1956), general and statesman during the dictatorship of Benito Mussolini
 Italo Balbo (1896–1940), airman and fascist leader who played a decisive role in developing Benito Mussolini's air force
Oreste Baratieri (1841–1901), general and governor of Italian Eritrea
 Cesare Battisti (1875–1916), politician
 Camillo Benso, conte di Cavour (1810–1861), politician, leading figure in the movement toward Italian unification
 Francesco Crispi (1819–1901), statesman who, after being exiled from Naples and Sardinia-Piedmont for revolutionary activities, eventually became premier of a united Italy
 Salvo D'Acquisto (1920–1943), member of the Italian Carabinieri, awarded the Gold Medal of Military Valor in memory of his heroism
Tommaso De Cristoforis,  Lieutenant Colonel  notable for his command during the Battle of Dogali and was awarded the Gold Medal of Military Valor
Francesco de Pinedo (1890–1933), aviator officer who is best known for his long-range flying boat flights in the 1920s that demonstrated the feasibility of global air travel.
 Armando Diaz (1861–1928), general and a Marshal of Italy during the I World War
 Giulio Douhet (1869–1930), military, the first to envision the true potential of airpower and strategic bombardment
Alessandro Ferrero La Marmora (1799–1855),  general who is best remembered for founding the military unit known as the Bersaglieri
Orestes Ferrara (1876-1972), attorney and journalist, who fought for Cuba's independence who founded one of the best newspapers of La Habana 
 Giuseppe Garibaldi (1807–1882), patriot and soldier of the Risorgimento; contributed to the achievement of Italian unification under the royal House of Savoy
 Maurizio Giglio (1920–1944), soldier, policeman and secret agent, recipient of the Gold Medal of Military Valor
 Giovanni Giolitti (1842–1928), statesman and five times prime minister under whose leadership Italy prospered
 Antonio Gramsci (1891–1937), intellectual and politician, a founder of the Italian Communist Party whose ideas greatly influenced Italian communism
Vittorio Emanuele Orlando (1860–1952), Prime Minister of Italy from October 1917 to June 1919. Representing Italy in the 1919 Paris Peace Conference with his foreign minister Sidney Sonnino. Known as "Premier of Victory" for defeating the Central Powers along with the Entente in World War I
 Giacomo Matteotti (1885–1924), socialist politician. He strongly denounced the National Fascist Party. Two weeks after his speech, he was kidnapped and murdered by fascists
 Giuseppe Mazzini (1805–1872), propagandist and revolutionary; a champion of the movement for Italian unity known as the Risorgimento
 Benito Mussolini (1883–1945), prime minister (1922–43) and the first of 20th-century Europe's fascist dictators
 Carlo Rosselli (1899–1937), political leader, journalist, and historian. He was committed to the anti-fascist struggle in Italy and in the Spanish Civil War
 Piero Torrigiani (1846–1920), mayor of Florence
 Enrico Toti (1882–1916), deportist, patriot and hero of World War I
Umberto II di Savoia (1904–1983), was the last King of Italy
 Victor Emmanuel II of Italy (1820–1878), King of Sardinia–Piedmont who became the first king of a united Italy
 Victor Emmanuel III of Italy (1869–1947), King of Italy whose reign brought the end of the Italian monarchy

Italian Republic

 Giulio Andreotti (1919–2013), Christian Democratic politician who was several times prime minister of Italy in the period from 1972 to 1992
 Enrico Berlinguer (1922–1984), secretary-general of the Italian Communist Party from March 1972 until his death
 Silvio Berlusconi (born 1936), media tycoon who served three times as prime minister of Italy (1994; 2001–06; 2008–11)
 Umberto Bossi (born 1941), politician who was leader (born 1991) of the Lega Nord party
 Bettino Craxi (1934–2000), politician who became his nation's first Socialist prime minister (1983–87)
 Alcide De Gasperi (1881–1954), statesman and politician, considered to be one of the Founding fathers of the European Union
 Enrico De Nicola (1877–1959), politician, the first provisional Head of State of the newborn republic of Italy from 1946 to 1948
 Antonio Di Pietro (born 1950), jurist and politician who uncovered a wide-ranging government corruption scandal
 Luigi Einaudi (1874–1961), economist and statesman, the first president (1948–55) of the Republic of Italy
Mario Draghi (born 1947), politician, economist, banker, prime minister of Italy since 2021. He served as President of the European Central Bank (ECB) between 2011 and 2019
Amintore Fanfani (1908–1999), leader served five times as premier of Italy
 Nilde Iotti (1920–1999), politician
 Aldo Moro (1916–1978), leader of the Christian Democratic Party, who served five times as premier of Italy. In 1978 he was kidnapped and subsequently murdered by left-wing terrorists
 Romano Prodi (born 1939), politician who was twice prime minister of Italy (1996–98; 2006–08) and who served as president of the European Commission (1999–2004)
 Antonio Segni (1891–1972), statesman, twice premier (1955–57, 1959–60), and fourth president (1962–64) of Italy
 Luigi Sturzo (1871–1959), priest, public official, and political organizer who founded a party that was a forerunner of the Italian Christian Democrat movement
 Palmiro Togliatti (1893–1964), politician who led the Italian Communist Party for nearly 40 years and made it the largest in Europe
 Altiero Spinelli (1907–1986), statesman, author of the so-called "Spinelli Plan", co-author of the Ventotene Manifesto, founder of the Crocodile Club, co-founder of the Union of European Federalists, hailed as one of the Fathers of European Union

Musicians

Composers

Middle Ages 
 Johannes Ciconia (c. 1370–1412), composer and theorist. His open melodic style, clarity of texture, and "modern" sense of harmonic direction make him an attractive and accessible composer
 Gherardello da Firenze (c. 1320/1325–1362–1363), composer. He was known for his liturgical compositions but only two mass movements have survived
 Guido of Arezzo (c. 990–1050), music theorist whose principles served as a foundation for modern Western musical notation
 Jacopo da Bologna (fl. 1340–1360), court composer during the Trecento and one of the earliest composers of polyphonic secular songs
 Francesco Landini (c. 1325/1335–1397), composer, organist and poet. Celebrated in his own day as a master of the Italian ars nova style, among his works are madrigals, cacce, and ballate
 Marchetto da Padova (fl. 1305–1319), music theorist and composer. He lived at Cesena and Verona at some time and was in the service of Rainier, Prince of Monaco

Renaissance 
 Giovanni Animuccia (c. 1500 – 1571), composer who contributed to the development of the oratorio
 Adriano Banchieri (1568–1634), one of the principal composers of madrigal comedies and choral pieces
 Giulio Caccini (1551–1618), composer and singer; Le nuove musiche (1602), a collection of songs with basso continuo, was of landmark importance in establishing the new monodic style
 Francesco Canova da Milano (1497–1543), lutenist and composer. Known as Il divino ("the divine"), he was the finest composer of lute music before John Dowland
 Emilio de' Cavalieri (1550–1602), composer. One of the earliest to compose dramatic music
 Andrea Gabrieli (1532/33–1585), composer and organist, known for his madrigals and his large-scale choral and instrumental music for public ceremonies
 Giovanni Gabrieli (c. 1554/1557–1612), composer and organist. He was one of the most influential musicians of his time
 Carlo Gesualdo (1566–1613), composer and lutist. He is famous for his intensely expressive madrigals, which use a chromatic language not heard of until the 19th century
 Giovanni Pierluigi da Palestrina (1525/1526–1594), composer associated with the Roman School (Renaissance music)
 Luzzasco Luzzaschi (c. 1545 – 1607), composer, organist, and teacher of the late Renaissance
 Luca Marenzio (1553–1599), composer whose madrigals are considered to be among the finest examples of Italian madrigals of the late 16th century
 Claudio Merulo (1533–1604), composer. He was organist of Brescia Cathedral (1556–7) and of St Mark's Basilica, Venice (1557–84), where he was also an organ consultant, publisher and teacher
 Claudio Monteverdi (1567–1643), composer, violinist and singer considered a crucial figure in the history of music
 Jacopo Peri (1561–1633), composer and singer; often called the inventor of opera
 Gioseffo Zarlino (1517–1590), composer and writer on music, the most celebrated music theorist of the mid-16th century

Baroque 
 Tomaso Albinoni (1671–1751), composer remembered chiefly for his instrumental music
 Gregorio Allegri (1582–1652), composer of church music. The famous Miserere, performed yearly on Wednesday and Friday of Passion Week, in the papal chapel, is his composition
 Francesca Caccini (1587–1641), composer and singer, daughter of Giulio Caccini. She was the first woman to compose opera and probably the most prolific woman composer of her time
 Antonio Caldara (1670/71–1736), composer. He composed many operas and oratorios, other sacred and secular vocal music, and chamber works. His canons were especially popular
 Giacomo Carissimi (1605–1674), composer and one of the most celebrated masters of the early Baroque, or, more accurately, the Roman School of music
 Francesco Cavalli (1602–1676), the most important Italian composer of opera in the mid-17th century
 Antonio Cesti (1623–1669), composer who, with Francesco Cavalli, was one of the leading Italian composers of the 17th century
 Arcangelo Corelli (1653–1713), violinist, composer, conductor and teacher. Founder of the Italian school of violin
 Girolamo Frescobaldi (1583–1643), musician and one of the most important composers of keyboard instrumental music in the late Renaissance and early Baroque music periods
 Francesco Geminiani (1687–1762), composer, violinist, teacher, writer on musical performance, and a leading figure in early 18th-century music
 Leonardo Leo (1694–1744), composer who was noted for his comic operas and who was instrumental in forming the Neapolitan style of opera composition
 Pietro Locatelli (1695–1764), composer and violinist. His influential L′arte del violino (1733) contains 12 solo violin concertos and 24 caprices for solo violin
 Jean Baptiste Lully (1632–1687), Italian-French composer. He was court composer to Louis XIV, founding the national French opera and producing court ballets for Molière's plays
 Giovanni Battista Pergolesi (1710–1736), composer whose intermezzo La serva padrona (1733) was one of the most celebrated stage works of the 18th century
 Nicola Porpora (1686–1768), composer. Leading Italian teacher of singing of the 18th century
 Alessandro Scarlatti (1660–1725), composer of operas and religious works. He is considered the founder of the Neapolitan school of opera
 Domenico Scarlatti (1685–1757), composer noted particularly for his 555 keyboard sonatas, which substantially expanded the technical and musical possibilities of the harpsichord
 Barbara Strozzi (1619–1677), virtuoso singer and composer of vocal music, one of only a few women in the 17th century to publish their own compositions
 Giuseppe Tartini (1692–1770), violinist, composer, and theorist who helped establish the modern style of violin bowing and formulated principles of musical ornamentation and harmony
 Giuseppe Torelli (1658–1709), composer and violinist, noted for his essential role in the development of the solo concerto, concerto grosso, and sonata da camera forms
 Antonio Vivaldi (1678–1741), composer, Italian baroque, known for violin music and the concerto grosso
 Domenico Zipoli (1688–1726), organist and composer. In 1716 he published his collection Sonate d'intavolatura per organo e cimbalo

Classical period 
 Luigi Boccherini (1743–1805), composer and cellist. His vast chamber music output includes some 125 string quintets, some 90 string quartets, and many string trios
 Ferdinando Carulli (1770–1841), guitarist, composer and teacher. Known for his concertos, sonatas, studies, variations and transcriptions (over 300 opus numbers)
 Domenico Cimarosa (1749–1801), composer; a leading representative of the opera buffa. Among his numerous works, Il matrimonio segreto (1792) is universally renowned
 Baldassare Galuppi (1706–1784), composer whose comic operas won him the title father of the opera buffa."
 Mauro Giuliani (1781–1829), the most important guitarist and composer of guitar music of his time
 Niccolò Jommelli (1714–1774), composer of religious music and operas, an innovator in his use of the orchestra
 Giovanni Battista Martini (1706–1784), composer, music theorist, and music historian who was internationally renowned as a teacher
 Giovanni Paisiello (1740–1816), one of the most successful and influential opera composers of his time. He composed more than 80 operas, including a very popular Barber of Seville (1782)
 Niccolò Piccinni (1728–1800), composer of more than 100 operas. His most famous opera was La buona figliuola (1760), which established him as one of the leading composers of his day
 Antonio Salieri (1750–1825), composer whose operas were acclaimed throughout Europe in the late 18th century
 Giovanni Battista Sammartini (1700/1701–1775), composer who was an important formative influence on the pre-Classical symphony
 Giovanni Battista Viotti (1755–1824), violinist and composer, principal founder of the 19th-century school of violin playing

Romantic 
 Vincenzo Bellini (1801–1835), opera composer. His most celebrated works are the operas La sonnambula and Norma (both 1831)
 Arrigo Boito (1842–1918), composer and poet. He is remembered for his opera Mefistofele (1868)
 Alfredo Catalani (1854–1893), composer of the popular opera La Wally (1892). His operas were among the most important in the period preceding the verismo school
 Luigi Cherubini (1760–1842), composer, who lived in Paris after 1788. Of his nearly 40 operas, the most popular were Lodoïska (1791), Médée (1797), and Les deux journées (1800)
 Muzio Clementi (1752–1832), composer, pianist, organist and teacher who is acknowledged as the first to write specifically for the piano
 Gaetano Donizetti (1797–1848), opera composer. Among his major works are Lucia di Lammermoor (1835), La fille du régiment (1840), and La favorite (1840)
 Ruggero Leoncavallo (1857–1919), opera composer whose fame rests on the opera Pagliacci (1892)
 Pietro Mascagni (1863–1945), operatic composer, one of the principal exponents of verismo. Mascagni came up with his masterpiece Cavalleria rusticana in 1890 to tremendous success
 Saverio Mercadante (1795–1870), composer, teacher and orchestrator. He is considered to have been an important reformer of Italian opera
Giuseppe Martucci (1856–1909), composer, conductor, pianist and teacher. Sometimes called "the Italian Brahms"
 Niccolò Paganini (1782–1840), composer and principal violin virtuoso of the 19th century
 Amilcare Ponchielli (1834–1886), composer, known for his opera La Gioconda (1876)
 Gioachino Rossini (1792–1868), composer nicknamed "The Italian Mozart". Operas include: The Barber of Seville (1816), La Cenerentola (1817), and Semiramide (1823)
 Gaspare Spontini (1774–1851), composer and conductor. His most acclaimed work was La Vestale (1807)
 Giuseppe Verdi (1813–1901), leading Italian composer of opera in the 19th century, noted for operas such as Rigoletto (1851), La traviata (1853), Aida (1871) and Otello (1887) among others

The 1900s 
Alfredo Antonini (1901–1983), conductor and composer who was active on the CBS radio and television networks from the 1930s through the early 1970s
Pippo Barzizza (1902–1994), composer, arranger, conductor and music director
 Luciano Berio (1925–2003), musician, whose success as theorist, conductor, composer, and teacher placed him among the leading representatives of the musical avant-garde
 Ferruccio Busoni (1866–1924), pianist and composer who attained fame as a pianist of brilliance and intellectual power
 Mario Castelnuovo-Tedesco (1895–1968), composer in the Neoromantic style. Literature and Judaism were influential in his compositions
 Vito Carnevali (1888 – c. 1960) composer of choral music for the Roman Catholic Church
 Francesco Cilea (1866–1950), composer whose operas are distinguished by their melodic charm. known for Adriana Lecouvreur (1902)
 Luigi Dallapiccola (1904–1975), composer known for his lyrical twelve-tone compositions
 Lorenzo Ferrero (born 1951), composer. Among his major works are the operas Salvatore Giuliano (1986), La Conquista (2005), and Risorgimento! (2011)
 Umberto Giordano (1867–1948), opera composer in the verismo, or "realist", style, known for his opera Andrea Chénier (1896)
Ruggero Leoncavallo (1857–1919), composer and opera librettist. Although he produced numerous operas and other songs  it is his opera Pagliacci (1892) that remained his lasting contribution
Bruno Maderna (1920-1973), composer and conductor. In 1955 he founded the Studio di fonologia musicale di Radio Milano with Luciano Berio disseminating contemporary music in Italy.
 Pietro Mascagni (1863–1945), opera composer, famous for Cavalleria rusticana, one of the classic verismo operas
Gian Carlo Menotti (1911–2007), composer, librettist, director, and playwright who is primarily known for his output of 25 operas
 Ennio Morricone (1928–2020), composer and conductor. He is considered one of the most prolific and influential film composers of his era
 Luigi Nono (1924–1990), leading Italian composer of electronic, aleatory, and serial music
Riz Ortolani (1926–2014), composer and conductor. He scored over 200 films and television programs  In 2013, he received a Lifetime Achievement from the World Soundtrack Academy.
 Goffredo Petrassi (1904–2003), composer of modern classical music, conductor, and teacher
Lorenzo Perosi (1873–1956), composer of sacred music and the only member of the Giovane Scuola who did not write opera.
Piero Piccioni (1921–2004), composer, pianist, organist, conductor, lawyer, he was also the prolific author of more than 300 film soundtracks
 Giacomo Puccini (1858–1924), composer of operas. His finest operas, La bohème (1896), Tosca (1900), Madama Butterfly (1904), and Turandot (produced posthumously in 1926)
 Ottorino Respighi (1879–1936), composer, known for colourful tone poems The Fountains of Rome (1916) and The Pines of Rome (1924)
 Nino Rota (1911–1979), composer of film scores, notably for the films of Federico Fellini and Luchino Visconti
Renato Serio (born 1946), composer, conductor and arranger.

Conductors 

 Claudio Abbado (1933–2014), conductor. Principal conductor of the London Symphony Orchestra (1979–88); director of the Vienna State Opera (1986–91), and the Berlin Philharmonic (1989–2001)
Salvatore Accardo (born 1941), violinist and conductor, who is known for his interpretations of the works of Niccolò Paganini.
Alfredo Antonini (1901–1983), leading symphony conductor and composer who was active on the international concert stage as well as on the CBS radio and television
Enrico Bevignani (1841–1903), conductor, harpsichordist, composer, chief conductor at the Royal Opera House, La Fenice, Mariinsky Theatre and the Bolshoi where notably conducted the world premiere of Pyotr Tchaikovsky's Eugene Onegin in 1879. 
 Ferruccio Busoni (1866–1924), pianist, conductor and composer who attained fame as a pianist of brilliance and intellectual power
Guido Cantelli (1920–1956), conductor. Arturo Toscanini elected him his "spiritual heir" since the beginnings of his career
Primo Casale (1904–1981), conductor, composer, and violinist. Promotor of the opera in Venezuela since 1948
 Riccardo Chailly (born 1953), conductor known for his devotion to contemporary music, and for his attempts to modernize approaches to the traditional symphonic repertory
Riccardo Drigo (1846–1930), conductor, composer of ballet music and Italian opera, and a pianist.
 Victor de Sabata (1892–1967), conductor and composer. He is widely recognized as one of the most distinguished operatic conductors of the 20th century
Piero Gamba (1936–2022), also known as Pierino Gamba, orchestral conductor and pianist. Gamba came to attention as a child prodigy.
 Daniele Gatti (born 1961), conductor. He is considered the foremost conductor of his generation"
Franco Ferrara (1911–1985), conductor and teacher ofvarious prominent conductors, including Roberto Abbado, Riccardo Chailly, Andrew Davis and Riccardo Muti
Gianandrea Gavazzeni (1909–1996), conductor of opera
 Carlo Maria Giulini (1914–2005), conductor esteemed for his skills in directing both grand opera and symphony orchestras
Vittorio Gui (1885–1975), conductor, composer, musicologist and critic
 Fabio Luisi (born 1959), conductor of the Vienna Symphony and the Staatskapelle Dresden
 Gianandrea Noseda (born 1964), conductor of the National Symphony Orchestra of Washington D.C.
Mantovani (1905–1980), known mononymously as Mantovani, conductor, composer and light orchestra-styled entertainer with a cascading strings musical signature.
 Riccardo Muti (born 1941), conductor of both opera and the symphonic repertory. He became one of the most respected and charismatic conductors of his generation
Giorgio Polacco (1875-1960), conductor of the Metropolitan Opera from 1915 to 1917 and the Chicago Civic Opera from 1921 to 1930
 Claudio Scimone (1934–2018), conductor. He founded I Solisti Veneti in 1959, specializing in 18th-century and 20th-century Italian music
 Tullio Serafin (1878–1968), conductor. An outstanding conductor of Italian opera, he did much to foster the revival of interest in Bellini and Donizetti
 Giuseppe Sinopoli (1946–2001), performed with an intensity and daring that made him one of Europe's most controversial orchestra leaders
 Arturo Toscanini (1867–1957), conductor, considered one of the great virtuoso conductors of the first half of the 20th century
Carlo Zecchi (1903–1984),  conductor, pianist and music teacher

Singers 

 Adamo (born 1943) – singer
 Alexia (born 1967) – singer/songwriter
 Alessandra Amoroso (born 1986) – singer/songwriter
 Annalisa (born 1985) – singer/songwriter
 Renzo Arbore (born 1937) – singer, musician TV presenter
 Arisa (born 1982) – singer/songwriter
 Bianca Atzei (born 1987) – singer/songwriter
 Serena Autieri (born 1976) – singer/songwriter
 Malika Ayane (born 1984) – singer/songwriter
 Baby K (born 1983) – singer/songwriter
 Umberto Balsamo (born 1943) – singer
 Annalisa (born 1985) – singer/songwriter
Carla Boni (1925–2009) – singer
 Carla Bruni (born 1967) – singer/songwriter 
 Bassi Maestro (born 1973) – rapper
 Claudio Baglioni (born 1951) – singer/songwriter
 Franco Battiato (1945–2021) – singer/songwriter, composer
 Lucio Battisti (1943–1998) – singer/songwriter
 Andrea Bocelli (born 1958) – gospel singer/tenor
 Fred Bongusto (1935–2019) – singer/songwriter
 Alessandra Belloni (born 1954) – singer, drummer, dancer, teacher
 Primo Brown (1976–2016) – rapper
 Edoardo Bennato (born 1946) – singer/songwriter
 Eugenio Bennato (born 1948) – singer/songwriter
 Loredana Bertè (born 1950) – performer
 Orietta Berti (born 1943) – singer
 Carla Bissi (Alice) (1954) – singer/songwriter
 Angelo Branduardi (born 1950) – singer/songwriter
 Michele Bravi (born 1994) – singer/songwriter
 Fred Buscaglione (1921–1960) – singer/songwriter
 Clementino (born 1982) – rapper
 Coez (born 1983) – singer/rapper
 Andrea Caccese (born 1988) − singer/songwriter
 Renato Carosone (1920–2001) – singer/songwriter
 Caterina Caselli (born 1946) – singer
 Raffaella Carrà (1943–2021) – singer/songwriter
 Albano Carrisi (born 1943) – singer/songwriter
 Marco Carta (born 1985) – singer/songwriter
 Adriano Celentano (born 1938) – singer/songwriter
Gigliola Cinquetti (born 1947) – singer/songwriter 
 Chiara (born 1986) – singer/songwriter
 Riccardo Cocciante (born 1946) – singer/songwriter
 Lodovica Comello (born 1990) – singer/songwriter
 Paolo Conte (born 1937) – singer/songwriter
Tony Croatto - (1940–2005) – singer/songwriter 
 Toto Cutugno (born 1946) – singer/songwriter
 Lorella Cuccarini (born 1965) – singer/songwriter
Betty Curtis (1936–2006) – singer
 Lucio Dalla (1943–2012) – singer/songwriter
 Pino Daniele (1955–2015) – singer/songwriter
Gigi D'Alessio (born 1967) – singer/songwriter
 Dargen D'Amico (born 1980) – rapper/singer
Pino D'Angiò (born 1952) – singer
 Cristina D'Avena (born 1964) – singer
 Fabrizio De André (1940–1999) – singer/songwriter
 Francesco De Gregori (born 1951) – singer/songwriter
 Roberto Demo (born 1965) – singer/songwriter
 Manuel De Peppe (born 1970) – singer/songwriter
 Teresa De Sio (born 1955) – singer/songwriter
 Nicola Di Bari (born 1940) – singer/songwriter
 Franco De Vita (born 1954) – singer/songwriter
Peppino di Capri (born 1939) – singer/songwriter 
Aldo Donà (1920–2011) – singer
Pino Donaggio (born 1941) – singer 
Aldo Donati (1947–2014) – singer/songwriter
Johnny Dorelli (born 1937) – singer 
 Egreen (born 1984) – rapper
 Elisa (born 1977) – singer/songwriter
 El Presidente (born 1972) – rapper
Bruno Filippini (born 1945) – singer
 Rosario Fiorello (born 1960) – singer/songwriter
Enzo Jannacci (1935–2013) – singer/songwriter
Gorni Kramer (1913–1995)– singer/songwriter 
 Emis Killa (born 1989) – rapper
 En?gma (born 1988) – rapper
 Ensi (born 1985) – rapper
 Fabri Fibra (born 1976) – rapper
 Fedez (born 1989) – rapper
 Fred De Palma (born 1989) – rapper
 Sergio Endrigo (1933–2005) – singer/songwriter
 Gabriella Ferri (1942–2004) – singer/songwriter
 Giusy Ferreri (born 1979) – singer/songwriter
 Tiziano Ferro (born 1980) – singer/songwriter
 Eugenio Finardi (born 1952) – singer/songwriter
Fiordaliso(born 1956) – singer
 Riccardo Fogli (born 1947) – singer/songwriter
Jimmy Fontana (1934–2013) – singer/songwriter
 Ivano Fossati (born 1951) – singer/songwriter
Rosanna Fratello (born in 1951) – singer and actress
 Gemitaiz (born 1988) – rapper
 Gué Pequeno (born 1980) – rapper
 Giorgio Gaber (1939–2003) – singer/songwriter
 Francesco Gabbani (born 1982) – singer/songwriter
 Rino Gaetano (1950–1981) – singer/songwriter
 Giorgia (born 1971) – singer/songwriter
Enrico Gentile (born 1921)– singer. In 1940 he founded a vocal quartet named Quartetto Cetra
Wilma Goich(born 1945) – singer
 Irene Grandi (born 1969) – singer/songwriter
 Francesco Guccini (born 1940) – singer/songwriter
 J-Ax (born 1972) – rapper
 Jovanotti (born 1966) – singer/songwriter and rapper
 Achille Lauro (born 1990) – rapper/singer
 Rudy La Scala (born 1954) – singer/songwriter and record producer
 Bruno Lauzi (1937–2006) – singer/songwriter
 Fausto Leali (born 1944) – singer/songwriter
 Luciano Ligabue (born 1960) – singer/songwriter
 MadMan (born 1988) – rapper
 Mahmood (born 1992) – singer/songwriter
 Marracash (born 1979) – rapper
 Cristiano Malgioglio (born 1945) – singer/songwriter
 Pablo Manavello (1950–2016) – singer/songwriter
 Fiorella Mannoia (born 1954) – performer
 Emma Marrone (born 1984) – singer/songwriter
 Mia Martini (1947–1995) – singer/performer
 Marco Masini (born 1964) – singer-songwriter, pianist
 Paolo Meneguzzi (born 1976) – singer/songwriter
 Marco Mengoni (born 1988) – singer/songwriter
 Francesca Michielin (born 1995) – singer/songwriter
 Milva (1939–2021) – performer
 Mina (born 1940) – performer
 Moreno (born 1989) – rapper/singer
 Domenico Modugno (1928–1994) – singer/songwriter
 Yves Montand (1921–1991) – singer/songwriter
 Gianni Morandi (born 1944) – performer
 Fabrizio Moro (born 1975) – singer/songwriter
 Franco Mussida (Premiata Forneria Marconi) (born 1947) – singer/songwriter
 Gianna Nannini (born 1954) – singer/songwriter
 Neffa (born 1967) – rapper/singer/songwriter
Nek (born 1972) – singer/songwriter
 Nesli (born 1980) – rapper
 Noemi (born 1982) – singer/songwriter
 Nitro (born 1993) – rapper
 Gino Paoli (born 1934) – singer/songwriter
 Laura Pausini (born 1974) – singer/songwriter
Rita Pavone (born 1946) – singer
Emilio Pericoli (1928–2013) – singer 
Nilla Pizzi (1919–2011) – singer
 Povia (born 1972) – singer/songwriter
 Patty Pravo (born 1948) – singer
Pupo(born1955), singer, lyricist, television presenter, writer and voice actor
 Alberto Rabagliati (1906–1974) – singer
 Rancore (born 1989) – rapper
 Rocco Hunt (born 1994) – rapper/singer
 Katyna Ranieri (1925–2018) – singer
 Massimo Ranieri (born 1951) – singer
 Eros Ramazzotti (born 1963) – singer/songwriter
 Mino Reitano (1944–2009) – singer/songwriter
 Tony Renis (born 1938) – singer
 Donatella Rettore (born 1953) – singer/songwriter
 Stefano Righi (born 1969) – singer/songwriter
 Vasco Rossi (born 1952) – singer/songwriter
 Fabio Rovazzi (born 1994) – rapper/singer
 Enrico Ruggeri (born 1957) – singer/songwriter
 Antonella Ruggiero (born 1952) – performer
 Giuni Russo (1951–2004) – singer/songwriter
 Salmo (born 1984) – rapper
 Shade (born 1987) – rapper
 Valerio Scanu (born 1990) – singer/songwriter
 Bobby Solo (born 1945) – singer/songwriter
 Demetrio Stratos (Area) (1945–1973) – singer/songwriter
 Aldo Tagliapietra (Le Orme) (1945) – singer/songwriter
 Luigi Tenco (1938–1967) – singer/songwriter
 Little Tony (1941–2013) – singer/songwriter
 Vacca (born 1979) – rapper
 Ornella Vanoni (born 1934) – performer
 Roberto Vecchioni (born 1943) – singer/songwriter
 Antonello Venditti (born 1949) – singer/songwriter
 Edoardo Vianello (born 1938) – singer/songwriter
Claudio Villa (1926–1987) – singer
Yordano (born 1951) – singer/songwriter
 Iva Zanicchi(born 1940) – singer
 Renato Zero (born 1950) – singer/songwriter
 Zucchero (born 1955) – singer/songwriter

Castrati singers 

 Antonio Bernacchi (1685–1756), contralto castrato, sang in operas throughout Italy and also abroad, notably at Munich and for Handel in London
 Caffarelli (1710–1783), contralto castrato. A pupil of Nicola Porpora; he sang for Handel in London, England, in 1738, creating the title roles in Faramondo and Serse
 Giovanni Carestini (c. 1704 – c. 1760), contralto castrato, one of the foremost of his time. Début Rome 1721
 Girolamo Crescentini (1762–1846), mezzo-soprano castrato. His repertory being chiefly operas by Zingarelli, Cimarosa and Gazzaniga
 Farinelli (1705–1782), both soprano and contralto
 Giacinto Fontana, called "Farfallino" (1692–1739), soprano castrato. He was active primarily in Rome, specialized in performing female roles (women were not permitted to appear onstage in the Papal States)
 Nicolò Grimaldi (1673–1732), mezzo-soprano castrato known for his association with the composer George Frideric Handel, in two of whose early operas he sang
 Giovanni Francesco Grossi (1653–1697), soprano castrato. He sang Siface in Cavalli's Scipione affricano (1671) and was thereafter always known by that name
 Gaetano Guadagni (1728–1792), contralto castrato, known for singing the role of Orpheus at the premiere of Gluck's opera Orfeo ed Euridice in 1762
 Giuseppe Millico, called "Il Moscovita" (1737–1802), soprano castrato, known for his association with the composer Christoph Willibald Gluck, he performed in all the latter's reform operas.
 Alessandro Moreschi (1858–1922), soprano castrato, known as the angel of Rome "because of vocal purity
 Gaspare Pacchierotti (1740–1821), soprano castrato, one of the most famous singers of his time
 Senesino (1686–1758), contralto castrato, renowned for his power and his skill in both coloratura and expressive singing
 Giovanni Velluti (1780–1861), soprano. The last of the leading castrate singers

Sopranos 

 Gemma Bellincioni (1864–1950), opera singer, soprano
 Maria Caniglia (1905–1979), soprano; one of the leading Italian dramatic sopranos of the 1930s and 1940s
 Mariella Devia (born 1948), after beginning her forty-five-year-long career as a lyric coloratura soprano, in recent years she has enjoyed success with some of the most dramatic roles in the bel canto repertoire.
 Mirella Freni (1935–2020), soprano; one of the dominant figures on the opera scene; she has since performed at many venues, including Milan, Vienna and Salzburg
Adalgisa Gabbi (1857–1933), operatic soprano
Cecilia Gasdia (born 1960),  operatic soprano.
 Amelita Galli-Curci (1882–1963), coloratura soprano
 Giulia Grisi (1811–1869), operatic soprano whose brilliant dramatic voice established her as an operatic prima donna for more than 30 years
 Fausta Labia (1870–1935), operatic soprano
 Claudia Muzio (1889–1936), operatic soprano, whose international career was among the most successful of the early 20th century. She brought drama and pathos to all her roles
 Giuditta Pasta (1797–1865), soprano. She was famed for her roles in the operas of Rossini, Bellini and Donizetti; acclaimed for her vocal range and expressiveness
 Adelina Patti (1843–1919), soprano; one of the great coloratura singers of the 19th century
 Amelia Pinto (1876–1946), remembered for Wagner and Puccini performances
 Renata Scotto (born 1934), soprano and opera director; considered one of the preeminent singers of her generation, specializing in the bel canto repertoire
 Renata Tebaldi (1922–2004), lyric soprano; one of the most acclaimed members of the Metropolitan Opera company from 1955 to 1973, and retired from singing in 1976
 Luisa Tetrazzini (1871–1940), coloratura soprano; one of the finest of her time

Mezzo-sopranos 

 Cecilia Bartoli (born 1966), operatic mezzo-soprano who achieved global stardom with her outstanding vocal skills
 Faustina Bordoni (1697–1781), mezzo-soprano; known for her beauty and acting as well as her vocal range and breath control
 Fiorenza Cossotto (born 1935), mezzo-soprano; she is considered by many to be one of the great mezzo-sopranos of the 20th century
 Armida Parsi-Pettinella (1868–1949), successful at the Scala, especially as Dalila
 Giulietta Simionato (1910–2010), mezzo-soprano who excelled at bel canto and lighter operas by Rossini and Mozart
 Ebe Stignani (1903/1904–1974), mezzo-soprano; member of the Scala ensemble and was regarded as its leading exponent of dramatic contralto and mezzo roles
 Lucia Valentini Terrani (1946–1998), mezzo-soprano, she was particularly associated with Rossini roles

Contraltos 

 Marietta Alboni (1823–1894), operatic contralto known for her classic Italian bel canto
 Clorinda Corradi (1804–1877), opera singer; one of the most famous contraltos in history
 Giuseppina Grassini (1773–1850), noted Italian contralto and a singing teacher

Tenors 

 Carlo Bergonzi (1924–2014), operatic tenor; from 1956 to 1983, his beautiful voice was a fixture in the 19th-century Italian and French repertoire at the Metropolitan Opera
 Andrea Bocelli (born 1958), opera tenor noted for his unique blend of opera and pop music
 Enrico Caruso (1873–1921), operatic tenor
 Franco Corelli (1921–2003), tenor; powerful voice and passionate singing style; had a major international opera career between 1951 and 1976
 Fernando De Lucia (1860/1861–1925), opera tenor and singing teacher who enjoyed an international career
 Mario Del Monaco (1915–1982), operatic tenor
 Giuseppe Di Stefano (1921–2008), lyric tenor who was hailed as one of the finest operatic tenors of his generation
 Giuseppe Filianoti (born 1974), operatic tenor noted for his beautiful voice and impressive stage presence.
 Beniamino Gigli (1890–1957), operatic tenor. The most famous tenor of his generation; was a leading in French and Italian operas from 1920 to 1932
Vittorio Grigolo (born 1977), operatic tenor
 Giacomo Lauri-Volpi (1892–1979), lyric-dramatic tenor; he performed throughout Europe and the Americas in a top-class career that spanned 40 years
 Giovanni Martinelli (1885–1969), operatic tenor; his repertoire of about 50 roles included the leading tenor roles in nearly all the principal Italian operas
 Luciano Pavarotti (1935–2007), lyric tenor
 Aureliano Pertile (1885–1952), lyric-dramatic tenor; one of the most important of the entire 20th century
 Gianni Raimondi (1923–2008), lyric tenor, particularly associated with the Italian repertory
 Giovanni Battista Rubini (1794–1854), tenor; known for playing heroic roles
 Tito Schipa (1888–1965), operatic tenor; considered one of the finest tenore di grazia in operatic history
 Francesco Tamagno (1850–1905), tenor; became famous for his performances in the title roles of Verdi's Otello and Don Carlos

Baritones 

 Pasquale Amato (1878–1942), operatic baritone; from 1908 to 1921 he sang leading baritone roles at the Metropolitan Opera
 Ettore Bastianini (1922–1967), operatic baritone; was particularly associated with the operas of Verdi
 Mattia Battistini (1856–1928), operatic baritone; a great master of bel canto
 Renato Bruson (born 1934), operatic baritone; one of the most important Verdi baritones of the late 20th and early 21st century
 Piero Cappuccilli (1926–2005), operatic baritone; enjoyed a 35-year career during which he was widely regarded as the leading Italian baritone of his generation
 Antonio Cotogni (1831–1918), operatic baritone
 Giuseppe De Luca (1876–1950), operatic baritone
 Tito Gobbi (1913–1984), operatic baritone; he sang in most of the great opera houses and was acclaimed for his acting ability
 Rolando Panerai (1924–2019), baritone; début Florence (1946) with Lucia di Lammermoor
 Giorgio Ronconi (1810–1890), operatic baritone; one of the most popular artists on the lyric stage until his retirement in 1866
 Titta Ruffo (1877–1953), operatic baritone
Antonio Scotti (1866–1936), baritone a principal artist of the New York Metropolitan Opera for more than 33 seasons, but also sang with great success at London's Royal Opera House, Covent Garden, and Milan's La Scala
 Giuseppe Taddei (1916–2010), baritone; he has performed more than 100 operatic roles over six decades

Basses 
 Salvatore Baccaloni (1900–1969), operatic bass; known for his large repertory, he sang nearly 170 roles in five languages
 Sesto Bruscantini (1919–2003), operatic bass-baritone, buffo singer
 Enzo Dara (1938–2017), bass buffo; one of the foremost performers of his generation
 Nazzareno De Angelis (1881–1962), operatic bass, particularly associated with Verdi, Rossini and Wagner roles
 Ferruccio Furlanetto (born 1949), bass; known as a brilliant interpreter in the Italian repertoire and as a Mozart-singer
 Luigi Lablache (1794–1858), operatic bass admired for his musicianship and acting
Paolo Montarsolo (1925–2006), operatic bass particularly associated with buffo roles
 Tancredi Pasero (1893–1983), bass; particularly associated with the Italian repertory
 Ezio Pinza (1892–1957), operatic performer who was the leading basso at the Metropolitan Opera House in New York City (1926–1948)
 Cesare Siepi (1923–2010), bass singer who won over audiences worldwide in signature roles such as Don Giovanni and Figaro in The Marriage of Figaro

Painters

Ancient Rome 

 Amulius (1st century AD), Roman painter. One of the principal painters of the Domus Aurea
 Furius Dionysius Philocalus (4th century AD), Roman chronograph and painter
 Pacuvius (220–130 BC), Roman writer and painter
 Studius (1st century BC and 1st century AD), Roman painter of the Augustan period

Middle Ages 

 Altichiero (c. 1330 – c. 1390), painter who was the effective founder of the Veronese school and perhaps the most significant northern Italian artist of the 14th century
 Bonaventura Berlinghieri (fl. 1235–1244), painter of the Gothic period. His most celebrated work is St. Francis of Assisi (1235); one of the earliest icons of the Saint
 Pietro Cavallini (c. 1250 – c. 1330), painter and mosaicist. His surviving works are frescoes in Santa Cecilia in Trastevere and in Santa Maria Donna Regina Vecchia
 Cimabue (before 1251–1302), painter and mosaicist. Among his works may be cited the Sta. Trinità Madonna (c. 1290) and the Madonna Enthroned with St. Francis (c. 1290 – 95)
 Coppo di Marcovaldo (fl. 1260–1276), painter, one of the earliest about whom there is a body of documented knowledge. His one signed work is the Madonna del Bordone (1261)
 Bernardo Daddi (c. 1280 – 1348), painter, the outstanding painter in Florence in the period after the death of Giotto (who was possibly his teacher)
 Duccio (fl. 1278–1319), painter. Founder of the Sienese school. His most celebrated work is a large altar called the Maestà (1308–1311) in the Siena cathedral
 Taddeo Gaddi (c. 1300 – 1366), painter and architect, known for the fresco series Life of the Virgin (completed in 1338)
 Giottino (fl. 1324–1369), painter of the school of Giotto. He has been credited with frescoes in Basilica of Santa Croce, Florence, and in the Lower Church of St. Francis in Assisi
 Giotto di Bondone (1266/7–1337), painter, the first of the great Italian masters. His work includes cycles of frescoes in Assisi, the Arena Chapel in Padua and the Church of Santa Croce
 Guido of Siena (13th century), painter. One of the innovators in Italian art after the dominance of the Byzantine style
 Ambrogio Lorenzetti (c. 1290 – 1348), painter of the Sienese school. Known for the cycle of frescoes (1337–39) in the Palazzo Pubblico, Siena
 Pietro Lorenzetti (c. 1280 – 1348), painter of the Sienese school. His Nativity of the Virgin (c. 1335 – 1342), is notable for his handling of perspective
 Simone Martini (c. 1284 – 1344), painter, important exponent of Gothic art. Among his works may be cited the Maestà fresco (1315) and Annunciation and two Saints (1333)
 Lippo Memmi (c. 1291 – 1356), painter from Siena. One of the artists who worked at the Orvieto Cathedral, for which he finished the Madonna dei Raccomandati (c. 1320)
 Orcagna (c. 1308 – 1368), painter, sculptor and architect. He was one of the leading artists of his day
 Paolo Veneziano (fl. 1333–1358), painter and possibly illuminator. He was by far the most prolific and influential Venetian painter of the early 14th century
 Giunta Pisano (fl. 1236–1255), painter. Three large Crucifixions are ascribed to the same master, whose signature can be traced on them
 Piero da Rimini, early 14th century, painter.
 Jacopo Torriti (fl. 1270–1300), painter and mosaicist. His work is now known only from two highly prominent signed apse mosaics in the basilicas of St. John Lateran and Santa Maria Maggiore

Renaissance and Mannerism 
 Mariotto Albertinelli (1474–1515), painter, known for The Visitation (1503) and The Annunciation (1510)
 Alessandro Allori (1535–1607), painter. His varied output included altarpieces, portraits, and tapestry designs. The Pearl Fishing (1570–1572) is generally considered his masterpiece
 Andrea del Castagno (c. 1421 – 1457), painter in the early Florentine Renaissance. Known for a series of monumental frescoes depicting the Last Supper
 Andrea del Sarto (1486–1530), painter. His most striking among other well-known works is the series of frescoes on the life of St. John the Baptist in the Chiostro dello Scalzo (c. 1515 – 1526)
 Andrea del Verrocchio (c. 1435 – 1488), sculptor and painter. Among his principal paintings are Baptism of Christ (1472–1475) and several versions of the Madonna and Child
 Sofonisba Anguissola (c. 1535 – 1625), painter, mainly of portraits, the first woman artist to win international renown
 Antonello da Messina (c. 1430 – 1479), Sicilian painter. Major works were altarpieces and portraits
 Antonio da Correggio (1489–1534), painter, known for the frescoes in the domes of San Giovanni Evangelista and the Cathedral of Parma, where he worked from 1520 to 1530
 Giuseppe Arcimboldo (1527–1593), painter, famous for his allegorical or symbolical compositions in which he arranged objects such as fruits and vegetables into the form of the human face
 Alesso Baldovinetti (1425–1499), painter. He contributed importantly to the fledgling art of landscape painting
 Jacopo de' Barbari (c. 1440–before 1516), painter and printmaker. His few surviving paintings (about twelve) include the first known example of trompe-l'œil since antiquity
 Federico Barocci (c. 1526 – 1612), leading painter of the central Italian school in the last decades of the 16th century and an important precursor of the Baroque style
 Jacopo Bassano (c. 1510 – 1592), painter of the Venetian school, known for his religious paintings, lush landscapes, and scenes of everyday life
 Domenico di Pace Beccafumi (1486–1551), painter, sculptor, draughtsman, printmaker and illuminator. He was one of the protagonists of Tuscan Mannerism
 Gentile Bellini (c. 1429 – 1507), painter, member of the founding family of the Venetian school of Renaissance painting, known for his portraiture and his scenes of Venice
 Giovanni Bellini (c. 1430 – 1516), painter. Among his works may be cited St. Francis in Ecstasy (c. 1480) and Portrait of Doge Leonardo Loredan (1501)
 Jacopo Bellini (c. 1400 – c. 1470), painter who introduced the principles of Florentine early Renaissance art into Venice
 Ambrogio Bergognone (c. 1470 – 1523–1524), painter. His most important works are the frescoes in the Certosa di Pavia
 Boccaccio Boccaccino (c. 1467 – c. 1525), painter. His most impressive work is the fresco cycle of the Life of the Virgin along the nave in the cathedral at Cremona
 Giovanni Antonio Boltraffio (1466/1467–1516), painter. He was a pupil of Leonardo da Vinci, whose style he adhered to faithfully
 Paris Bordone (1500–1571), painter of religious, mythological, and anecdotal subjects, known for his striking sexualized paintings of women
 Sandro Botticelli (c. 1445 – 1510), painter of the Florentine school. The Primavera (c. 1482) and The Birth of Venus (c. 1486) rank now among the most familiar masterpieces of Florentine art
 Francesco Botticini (1446–1498), painter profoundly influenced by Castagno; worked under and was formed by Cosimo Rosselli and Verrocchio
 Bramantino (c. 1456 – c. 1530), painter and architect, a follower of Bramante, from whom he takes his nickname
 Bronzino (1503–1572), painter. He is noted chiefly for his stylized portraits. Of his religious works, Deposition of Christ (1540–1545) is the most famous
 Luca Cambiasi (1527–1585), painter and draughtsman. He was the outstanding Genoese painter of the 16th century
 Vittore Carpaccio (c. 1460 – 1525–1526), painter active in Venice, known for the cycle depicting the life of Saint Ursula and the Saint George series
 Cennino Cennini (c. 1370 – c. 1440), painter, known for writing Il libro dell'arte (1437), source on the methods, techniques, and attitudes of medieval artists
 Cigoli (1559–1613), painter, draughtsman, architect and scenographer. He was one of the most influential artists in 17th-century Florence
 Cima da Conegliano (c. 1459 – c. 1517), painter of the Venetian school whose style was marked by its use of landscape and by airy, luminous colour
 Niccolò Antonio Colantonio (fl. 1440–1470), painter, based in Naples, where he painted religious paintings in a style marked by Flemish influence
 Francesco del Cossa (c. 1430 – c. 1477), painter of the Ferrarese school, best known works are the frescoes in the Palazzo Schifanoia at Ferrara (probably commissioned in 1469)
 Lorenzo Costa (1460–1535), painter of the Ferrarese and Bolognese schools, known for his painting the Madonna and Child with the Bentivoglio family (1483)
 Carlo Crivelli (c. 1435 – c. 1495), painter. All his works were of religious subjects, done in an elaborate, old-fashioned style reminiscent of the linearism of Andrea Mantegna
 Daniele da Volterra (c. 1509 – 1566), painter and sculptor, noted for his finely drawn, highly idealized figures done in the style of Michelangelo
 Ercole de' Roberti (c. 1451 – 1496), painter. His dynamic figurative compositions are marked by an exceptional intensity of feeling
 Francesco de' Rossi (1510–1563), painter and designer, one of the leading Mannerist fresco painters of the Florentine-Roman school
 Niccolò dell'Abbate (1509 or 1512–1571), painter and decorator. He is credited with introducing landscape painting in France
 Dosso Dossi (c. 1490 – 1542), painter and leader of the Ferrarese school in the 16th century
 Gaudenzio Ferrari (c. 1471 – 1546), painter and sculptor, one of the leading representatives of the Lombard school
 Rosso Fiorentino (1494–1540), painter. His masterpiece is generally considered to be the Deposition or Descent from the Cross altarpiece in the Pinacoteca Comunale di Volterra
 Lavinia Fontana (1552–1614), painter. She was one of the first women painters in European history to have enjoyed professional success
 Prospero Fontana (1512–1597), painter, father of Lavinia Fontana. One of the leading painters in Bologna
 Vincenzo Foppa (c. 1430 – c. 1515), painter, leading figure in 15th-century Lombard art
 Fra Angelico (c. 1395 – 1455), painter. His best-known works are frescoes at the monastery of San Marco, Florence, and in the chapel of Pope Nicholas V in the Vatican
 Fra Bartolomeo (1472–1517), painter, a leading figure of the High Renaissance. Noted for his austere religious works
 Franciabigio (1482–1525), painter, known for his portraits and religious paintings
 Agnolo Gaddi (c. 1350 – 1396), painter. He was an influential and prolific artist who was the last major Florentine painter stylistically descended from Giotto
 Fede Galizia (1578–1630), painter, one of the earliest still life painters in Italy, who was also known for miniature portraits, landscapes, and religious subjects
 Gentile da Fabriano (c. 1370 – 1427), painter, one of the outstanding exponents of the elegant international Gothic style
 Domenico Ghirlandaio (1449–1494), painter. His most famous achievement is his fresco cycle of the life of Mary and St. John the Baptist for the choir of Santa Maria Novella (1485–1490)
 Ridolfo Ghirlandaio (1483–1561), painter. He was the son of Domenico Ghirlandaio, and was trained in his father's workshop
 Giorgione (c. 1477/8–1510), painter of the Venetian school. His The Tempest (c. 1508), a milestone in Renaissance landscape painting
 Giovanni da Udine (1487–1564), painter and architect. A pupil of Raphael and one of his assistants in painting the frescoes of the Vatican
 Giovanni di Paolo (c. 1403 – 1482), painter. One of the most attractive and idiosyncratic painters of the Sienese School
 Stefano di Giovanni (c. 1400 – 1450), painter of the Sienese school, is noted for the gentle piety of his art
 Benozzo Gozzoli (c. 1421 – 1497), painter. He is famous for his numerous frescos, such as The Journey of the Magi to Bethlehem (1459–1461) in the Medici Palace, Florence
 Leonardo da Vinci (1452–1519), painter, sculptor, architect, musician, engineer and scientist. The supreme example of Renaissance genius. Author of Mona Lisa (c. 1503 – 1506)
 Filippino Lippi (c. 1457 – 1504), painter. His most popular painting is the Apparition of the Virgin to St. Bernard altarpiece (1480)
 Filippo Lippi (c. 1406 – 1469), painter. His finest fresco cycle is in Prato cathedral and depicts the lives of St. Stephen and St. John the Baptist
 Gian Paolo Lomazzo (1538–1592), painter. His first work, Trattato dell'arte della pittura, scoltura et architettura (1584) is in part a guide to contemporary concepts of decorum
 Lorenzo di Credi (1459–1537), painter and sculptor. Examples of his art are the Madonna with Child and Two Saints and Adoration
 Lorenzo Monaco (c. 1370 – c. 1425), painter, one of the leading artists in Florence at the beginning of the 15th century
 Lorenzo Lotto (c. 1480 – 1556), painter known for his perceptive portraits and mystical paintings of religious subjects
 Bernardino Luini (c. 1480/1482–1532), painter, known for his mythological and religious frescoes
 Andrea Mantegna (c. 1431 – 1506), painter. His most important works were nine tempera pictures of Triumph of Caesar (c. 1486) and his decoration of the ceiling of the Camera degli Sposi
 Masaccio (1401–1428), painter. His most famous works are the frescoes in the Brancacci Chapel and in the church of Santa Maria del Carmine, in Florence
 Masolino da Panicale (c. 1383 – c. 1447), painter of the Florentine school. He collaborated with Masaccio, in a cycle of frescoes in the Brancacci Chapel in Santa Maria del Carmine, in Florence
 Melozzo da Forlì (c. 1438 – 1494), painter of the Umbrian school. One of the great fresco artists of the 15th century
 Michelangelo (1475–1564), sculptor, painter, architect and poet who exerted an unparalleled influence on the development of Western art. Author of The Creation of Adam (c. 1511)
 Moretto da Brescia (c. 1498 – 1554), painter. Together with Romanino and Girolamo Savoldo, he was one of the most distinguished painters of Brescia of the 16th century
 Giovanni Battista Moroni (c. 1520/1524–1578), painter. He was known for his sober and dignified portraits
 Palma Giovane (1548/1550–1628), painter. The leading Venetian painter and draftsman of the late 16th and early 17th centuries
 Palma Vecchio (c. 1480 – 1528), painter of the High Renaissance, noted for the craftsmanship of his religious and mythological works
 Parmigianino (1503–1540), painter, one of the first artists to develop the elegant and sophisticated version of Mannerist style
 Perino del Vaga (1501–1547), painter. A pupil and assistant of Raphael Sanzio in Rome, he carried out decorations in the Logge of the Vatican from Raphael's designs
 Francesco Pesellino (1422–1457), painter of the Florentine school who excelled in the execution of small-scale paintings
 Piero della Francesca (c. 1415 – 1492), painter and mathematician. His most famous cycle, The History of the True Cross (1452–1466), depicts scenes from the Golden Legend
 Piero di Cosimo (1462–1521), painter noted for his eccentric character and his fanciful mythological paintings
 Pietro Perugino (1446–1524), painter. One of his most famous masterpieces is The Delivery of the Keys (1481–1482), in the Sistine Chapel
 Pinturicchio (1454–1513), painter, known for his highly decorative frescoes. His most elaborate project was the decoration of the Cathedral of Siena
 Pisanello (c. 1395 – 1455), medalist and painter. He is regarded as the foremost exponent of the International Gothic style in Italian painting
 Polidoro da Caravaggio (c. 1499 – 1543), painter. One of the most original and innovative artists of the mid-16th century
 Antonio del Pollaiuolo (1429/1433–1498), painter, sculptor, goldsmith, and engraver, was a master of anatomical rendering and excelled in action subjects, notably mythologies
 Pontormo (1494–1557), painter. He is thought to have painted Vertumnus and Pomona (1520–1521), which shows qualities characteristic of mannerism
 Il Pordenone (c. 1484 – 1539), painter chiefly known for his frescoes of religious subjects
 Francesco Primaticcio (1504–1570), painter, architect, sculptor, and leader of the first school of Fontainebleau
 Francesco Raibolini (c. 1450 – 1517), painter, goldsmith and medallist. His major surviving paintings are altarpieces, mostly images of the Virgin and saints
 Raphael (1483–1520), painter and architect, expressed the ideals of the High Renaissance, known for his Madonnas
 Giulio Romano (c. 1499 – 1546), painter and architect. Well-known oils include The Stoning of St. Stephen (Church of Santo Stefano, Genoa) and Adoration of the Magi (Louvre)
 Cosimo Rosselli (1439–1507), painter. Of his many works in Florence the most famous is The Miracle-working Chalice in Sant' Ambrogio, a work that includes many contemporary portraits
 Andrea Schiavone (c. 1510/15–1563), painter and etcher. His most characteristic works were fairly small religious or mythological pictures for private patrons
 Sebastiano del Piombo (c. 1485 – 1547), painter of the Venetian School, known for his portraits, including his portrayal of Pope Clement VII (1526)
 Luca Signorelli (c. 1445 – 1523), painter, known for his nudes and for his novel compositional devices. His masterpiece is the fresco cycle in Orvieto Cathedral
 Il Sodoma (1477–1549), painter, a master of the human figure and leading pupil of Leonardo da Vinci
 Francesco Squarcione (c. 1395 – after 1468), painter who founded the Paduan school and is known for being the teacher of Andrea Mantegna and other noteworthy painters
 Taddeo di Bartolo (c. 1362 – 1422), painter. He was the leading painter in Siena in the first two decades of the 15th century and also worked in and for other cities
 Antonio Tempesta (1555–1630), painter and engraver from Florence who specialised in pastoral scenes
 Pellegrino Tibaldi (1527–1596), painter, sculptor, and architect who spread the style of Italian Mannerist painting in Spain during the late 16th century
 Tintoretto (1518–1594), painter of the Venetian school. One of the most important artists of the late Renaissance. His works include St. George and the Dragon (1555)
 Titian (c. 1488/1490–1576), painter of the Venetian school, noted for his religious and mythological works, such as Bacchus and Ariadne (1520–1523), and his portraits
 Cosimo Tura (c. 1430 – 1495), painter who was the founder and the first significant figure of the 15th-century school of Ferrara
 Paolo Uccello (1397–1475), painter. His three panels depicting The Battle of San Romano (1438), combine the decorative late Gothic style with the new heroic style of the early Renaissance
 Bartolomeo Veneto (fl. 1502–1546), painter who worked in Northern Italy in an area bounded by Venice and Milan
 Domenico Veneziano (c. 1410 – 1461), painter. In Florence he created his most celebrated work, the St. Lucy Altarpiece (c. 1445 – 1447)
 Paolo Veronese (1528–1588), painter of the Venetian school, famous for paintings such as The Wedding at Cana (1563) and The Feast in the House of Levi (1573)
 Alvise Vivarini (1442/1453–1503–1505), painter in the late Gothic style whose father, Antonio, was the founder of the influential Vivarini family of Venetian artists
 Bartolomeo Vivarini (c. 1432 – c. 1499), painter and member of the influential Vivarini family of Venetian artists
 Jacopo Zabolino (active 1461–1494) painter of frescoes of a mainly religious theme
 Federico Zuccari (c. 1540/1541–1609), painter and architect. He was the author of L'idea de' Pittori, Scultori, ed Architetti (1607)
 Taddeo Zuccari (1529–1566), painter. One of the most popular members of the Roman mannerist school

Baroque and Rococo 
 Francesco Albani (1578–1660), painter, known for paintings of mythological and poetic subjects
 Giacomo Alberelli (1600–1650), painter, pupil of Jacopo Palma the Younger
 Cristofano Allori (1577–1621), painter. He became one of the foremost Florentine artists of the early Baroque period, also winning renown as a courtier, poet, musician and lover
 Jacopo Amigoni (1682–1752), painter and etcher. His oeuvre includes decorative frescoes for churches and palaces, history and mythological paintings and a few etchings
 Leonardo dell'Arca (active c. 1600), engraver. His work is held permanently at the Victoria and Albert Museum.
 Marcello Bacciarelli (1731–1818), painter working at the royal court in Warsaw, who captured seminal moments in Polish history on canvas
 Sisto Badalocchio (1585 – c. 1647), painter and engraver. His most important work are the frescoes in the cupola and pendentives of St. John the Baptist (Reggio Emilia)
 Pompeo Batoni (1708–1787), painter
 Bernardo Bellotto (1720–1780), painter of vedute ("view paintings")
 Guido Cagnacci (1601–1663), painter. Particularly noteworthy are his altarpieces of the Virgin and Child with Three Carmelite Saints (c. 1631) and Christ with Saints Joseph and Eligius (1635)
 Canaletto (1697–1768), painter and etcher, noted particularly for his highly detailed paintings of cities, esp Venice, which are marked by strong contrasts of light and shade
 Battistello Caracciolo (1578–1635), painter. Caravaggesque painter and the founder of Neapolitan Caravaggism
 Caravaggio (1571–1610), painter of the baroque whose influential works, such as The Entombment of Christ (1602–1603), are marked by intense realism and revolutionary use of light
 Annibale Carracci (1560–1609), painter. Well known among his numerous works are The Beaneater (1580–1590), The Choice of Hercules (1596) and Domine quo vadis?  (c. 1603)
 Ludovico Carracci (1555–1619), painter, draughtsman and etcher born in Bologna
 Rosalba Carriera (1675–1757), portrait painter and miniaturist, Rococo style, known for her work in pastels
 Giuseppe Crespi (1665–1747), painter of the Bolognese school, known for the imposing paintings of the Seven Sacraments (1712)
 Carlo Dolci (1616–1686), Florentine painter, known for his paintings of the heads and half-figures of Jesus and the Mater Dolorosa
 Domenichino (1581–1641), painter of the baroque eclectic school who is noted for his religious and mythological works, including several frescoes of Saint Cecilia
 Domenico Fetti (c. 1589 – 1623), painter whose best-known works are small representations of biblical parables
Filippo Gagliardi (1606-1659), painter active mainly in Rome. helped in the renovation of San Martino ai Monti (1647–54). He was a member of the Accademia di San Luca from at least 1638 and became principe in 1656–58. He was also a member of the Congregazione dei Virtuosi del Pantheon.
Giovanni Battista Gaulli (1639–1709), painter. He was a celebrated artist of the Roman High Baroque. Worship of the Holy Name of Jesus (1674–1679) is his most noted work
 Artemisia Gentileschi (1593–1653), painter. Among her works may be cited Susanna and the Elders (1610) and Judith Slaying Holofernes (1614–1620)
 Orazio Gentileschi (1563–1639), painter. The Annunciation (1623), painted in Genoa and now in the Galleria Sabauda of Turin, is considered by several authorities his masterpiece
 Luca Giordano (1634–1705), painter, the most important Italian decorative artist of the second half of the 17th century
 Francesco Guardi (1712–1793), painter, a follower of Canaletto. His many charming landscapes are in the galleries of London, Paris, Venice and Boston
 Guercino (1591–1666), painter. Extremely skillful, prolific, and quick to finish his work, he was known for his frescoes, altarpieces, oils, and drawings
 Giovanni Lanfranco (1582–1647), painter, one of the foremost artists of the High Baroque. His masterpiece is the Assumption of the Virgin in the dome of Sant'Andrea della Valle (1625–1627)
 Pietro Longhi (1702–1785), painter, known for his small pictures depicting the life of upper-middle-class Venetians of his day
 Alessandro Magnasco (1667–1749), painter, known for his scenes of disembodied, flame-like figures in stormy landscapes or cavernous interiors
 Bartolomeo Manfredi (1582–1622), painter, active mainly in Rome, where he was one of the most important of Caravaggio's followers
 Carlo Maratta (1625–1713), painter and engraver of the Roman school; one of the last great masters of Baroque classicism
 Pietro Novelli (1603–1647), painter. Probably the most distinguished Sicilian painter of the 17th century
 Giovanni Paolo Panini (1691–1765), the foremost painter of Roman topography in the 18th century
 Giovanni Battista Piazzetta (1682–1754), painter, illustrator and designer. His most popular work is the celebrated Fortune Teller (1740)
 Andrea Pozzo (1642–1709), painter, a leading exponent of the baroque style. His masterpiece is the nave ceiling of the Church of Sant'Ignazio in Rome
 Mattia Preti (1613–1699), painter, called Il Calabrese for his birthplace. His most substantial undertaking was the decoration of St. John's, Valletta
 Guido Reni (1575–1642), painter noted for the classical idealism of his renderings of mythological and religious subjects
 Sebastiano Ricci (1659–1734), painter. He is remembered for his decorative paintings, which mark the transition between the late Baroque and the development of the Rococo style
 Salvator Rosa (1615–1673), painter, etcher and poet, known for his spirited battle pieces painted in the style of Falcone, for his marines, and especially for his landscapes
 Francesco Solimena (1657–1747), painter. The leading artist of the Neapolitan Baroque during the first half of the 18th century
 Massimo Stanzione (c. 1586 – c. 1656), painter. His style has a distinctive refinement and grace that has earned him the nickname "the Neapolitan Guido Reni."
 Bernardo Strozzi (c. 1581 – 1644), painter
 Giovanni Battista Tiepolo (1696–1770), painter. His frescoes in the Palazzo Labia and the doge's palace won him international fame
 Giovanni Domenico Tiepolo (1727–1804), painter and printmaker. His most noted early works are the chinoiserie decorations of the Villa Valmarana in Vicenza (1757)

The 1800s 
 Giuseppe Abbati (1836–1868), painter of the macchiaioli group
 Andrea Appiani (1754–1817), fresco painter active in Milan and a court painter of Napoleon
 Giovanni Boldini (1842–1931), painter, one of the most renowned society portraitists of his day. He worked mainly in Paris, where he settled in 1872
Fyodor Bruni (1799–1875), painter who worked in the Academic style
 Constantino Brumidi (1805–1880), Italian-American painter, whose best-known works are his frescoes in the Capitol building, Washington, D.C.
 Vincenzo Camuccini (1771–1844), painter. His many drawings reveal a fluid technique and lively artistic imagination
 Antonio Ciseri (1821–1891), painter of religious subjects
 Giuseppe De Nittis (1846–1884), painter, mainly of landscapes and scenes of city life
 Giacomo Di Chirico (1844–1883), Neapolitan painter
 Giovanni Fattori (1825–1908), painter; leading figure of the macchiaioli school
 Teresa Fioroni-Voigt (1799–1880), was a miniaturist
 Francesco Hayez (1791–1882), painter, the leading artist of Romanticism in mid-19th-century Milan. His masterpiece is The Kiss (1859)
 Cesare Maccari (1840–1919), painter and sculptor, most famous for his fresco at Palazzo Madama portraying Cicero revealing Catilina's plot (1888)
 Romualdo Prati (1874–1930), painter, mostly known for portraits. He also worked in Brazil.
 Giovanni Segantini (1858–1899), painter known for his Alpine landscapes and allegorical pictures, which blended Symbolist content with the technique of Neo-Impressionism

The 1900s 
 Pietro Annigoni (1910–1988), painter (and occasional sculptor), the only artist of his time to become internationally famous as a society and state portraitist
 Giacomo Balla (1871–1958), painter, sculptor, stage designer, decorative artist and actor. He was one of the originators of Futurism
 Alziro Bergonzo (1906–1997), architect and painter
 Vincenzo Bianchini (1903–2000), painter, sculptor, writer, poet, doctor and philosopher
 Umberto Boccioni (1882–1916), painter, sculptor and theorist. His painting The City Rises (1910) is a dynamic composition of swirling human figures in a fragmented crowd scene
 Erma Bossi (1875-1952), German Expressionist painter
 Alberto Burri (1915–1995), painter and sculptor. He was one of the first artists to exploit the evocative force of waste materials, looking forward to Trash art in America and Arte Povera in Italy
 Aldo Carpi (1886–1973), rector of the Brera Academy and author of a collection of memoirs concerning his imprisonment in the infamous Mauthausen-Gusen concentration camp.
 Carlo Carrà (1881–1966), painter, known for his still lifes in the style of Metaphysical painting
 Bruno Caruso (1927–2018), painter, illustrator and political activist. He was a celebrated Italian Social Realist and member of the Italian neorealism movement.
 Nicoletta Ceccoli (born 1973), children's book illustrator
 Francesco Clemente (born 1952), painter and draftsman whose dramatic figural imagery was a major component in the revitalization of Italian art beginning in the 1980s
 Enzo Cucchi (born 1949), painter, draughtsman and sculptor. He was a key member of the Italian Transavantgarde movement
 Giorgio de Chirico (1888–1978), painter, founder of the scuola metafisica art movement
 Annalaura di Luggo
 Lazzaro Donati (1926–1977), painter. Born in Florence and attended the Academy of Fine Arts. He began to paint in 1953, and in 1955 held his first exhibition at the Indiano Gallery in Florence.
 Lucio Fontana (1899–1968), painter, sculptor and theorist, founder of Spatialism, noted for gashed monochrome paintings
 Renato Guttuso (1911–1987), painter. He was a forceful personality and Italy's leading exponent of Social realism in the 20th century
 Piero Manzoni (1933–1963), artist. He is regarded as one of the forerunners of Arte Povera and Conceptual art
 Amedeo Modigliani (1884–1920), painter and sculptor whose portraits and nudes, characterized by asymmetrical compositions, are among the most important portraits of the 20th century
 Giorgio Morandi (1890–1964), painter and etcher. He is widely acknowledged as a major Italian painter of the 20th century
 Giuseppe Pellizza da Volpedo (1868–1907), painter. His most famous work is The Fourth Estate (1901); a symbol of the 20th
 Giovanni Pelliccioli (born 1947), surrealist painter. In 1993 he created a new form in the world of the artistic painting – the "triangle"
 Luigi Russolo (1885–1947), painter. One of the five signers of the basic 1910 "Manifesto of Futurist Painting" before switching his attention to music
 Emilio Scanavino (1922–1986), painter and sculptor. One of the most important protagonists of the Spatialist movement in Italy
 Gino Severini (1883–1966), painter who synthesized the styles of Futurism and Cubism
 Mario Sironi (1885–1961), painter, sculptor, illustrator and designer. He was the leading artist of the Novecento Italiano group in the 1920s, developing a muscular, monumental figurative style
 Antonio Diego Voci (1920–1985), painter. Born in Gasperina, Calabria, Italy. Artist of a Thousand Faces. Surrealism Cubism Fauvism Realism Italian
 Sergio Zanni (born 1942), painter and sculptor
 Giulia Andreani (born 1985), painter. She works on archives and develops a history painting.

Photographers 
Severo Antonelli (1907–1995)
Felice Beato (1834–1909)
Anton Giulio Bragaglia (1890–1960)
 Giuseppe Incorpora (1834–1914)
Franco Rubartelli (born 1937)
Paolo Gasparini (born 1934)
Pietro Marubi (1834–1903)
Tina Modotti (1896–1942) 
Ferdinando Scianna (born 1943)
Oliviero Toscani (born 1942)

Printers 

 Panfilo Castaldi (c. 1398 – c. 1490), physician and "master of the art of printing", to whom local tradition attributes the invention of moveable type
 Fortunato Bartolomeo de Felice, 2nd Conte di Panzutti (1723–1789), printer, publisher and scientist. Settled in Yverdon where he published a version of the Encyclopédie (1770–1780). Also known for his escapades across Europe with a married Countessa.
 Francesco Franceschi (c. 1530 – c. 1599), printer. Known for the high quality of his engravings, which were done using metal plates rather than wooden
 Gabriele Giolito de' Ferrari (c. 1508 – 1578), bookseller, printer and editor at Venice. He was one of the first major publishers of literature in the vernacular Italian language
 Johannes Philippus de Lignamine (c. 1420–?), printer and publisher, known for his publication of Herbarium Apuleii Platonici (1481)
 Aldus Manutius (1449–1515), printer, noted for his fine editions of the classics. Inventor of the italic type (1501) and also the first to use the semicolon
 Aldus Manutius the Younger (1547–1597), printer, last member of the Italian family of Manutius to be active in the famous Aldine Press
 Giovanni Battista Pasquali (1702–1784), printer, a leading printer in 18th-century Venice
 Pietro Perna (1519–1582), printer, the leading printer of late Renaissance Basel
 Ottaviano Petrucci (1466–1539), printer. Inventor of movable metal type for printing mensural and polyphonic music
 Lawrence Torrentinus (1499–1563), typographer and printer for Cosimo I de' Medici, Grand Duke of Tuscany

Printmakers 

 Domenico Campagnola (c. 1500 – 1564), painter and printmaker and one of the first professional draftsmen
 Giulio Campagnola (c. 1482 – c. 1515), painter and engraver who anticipated by over two centuries the development of stipple engraving
 Agostino Carracci (1557–1602), painter and printmaker. He was the brother of the more famous Annibale and cousin of Lodovico Carracci
 Giovanni Francesco Cassioni (17th century), engraver in wood
 Stefano della Bella (1610–1664), printmaker noted for his engravings of military events, in the manner of Jacques Callot
 Marcantonio Raimondi (c. 1480 – c. 1534), engraver, known for being the first important printmaker. He is therefore a key figure in the rise of the reproductive print
 Mario Labacco (active 1551–67), engraver
 Francesco Rosselli (1445–before 1513), miniature painter, and an important engraver of maps and old master prints
 Ugo da Carpi (c. 1480–between 1520 and 1532), painter and printmaker, the first Italian practitioner of the art of the chiaroscuro woodcut

Saints 

 Agatha of Sicily (fl. 3rd century AD), legendary Christian saint, martyred under Roman Emperor Decius. She is invoked against outbreaks of fire and is the patron saint of bell makers
 Agnes of Rome (c. 291–c. 304), legendary Christian martyr, the patron saint of girls
 Robert Bellarmine (1542–1621), theologian, cardinal, Doctor of the Church, and a principal influence in the Counter-Reformation
 Bernardine of Siena (1380–1444), preacher. He was a Franciscan of the Observant congregation and one of the most effective and most widely known preachers of his day
 Charles Borromeo (1538–1584), cardinal and archbishop. He was one of the leaders of the Counter-Reformation
 John Bosco (1815–1888), Catholic priest, pioneer in educating the poor and founder of the Salesian Order
 Catherine of Siena (1347–1380), Dominican tertiary, mystic, and patron saint of Italy who played a major role in returning the papacy from Avignon to Rome (1377)
 Saint Cecilia (2nd century AD), patron saint of musicians and Church music. Venerated in both East and West, she is one of the eight women commemorated by name in the Canon of the Mass
Paula Frassinetti (1809–1892), founder of the Congregation of the Sisters of Saint Dorothy. Her feast day is June 11
 Francis of Paola (1416–1507), mendicant friar. The founder of the Minims, a religious order in the Catholic Church
 Hippolytus of Rome (170–235), Christian martyr who was also the first antipope (217/218–235)
 Januarius (?–c. 305), Bishop and martyr, sometimes called Gennaro, long popular because of the liquefaction of his blood on his feast day
 Lawrence of Brindisi (1559–1619), Capuchin friar. He was one of the leading polemicists of the Counter-Reformation in Germany
 Saint Longinus (1st century AD), Roman soldier who pierced Jesus's side with a spear as he hung on the cross
 Saint Lucy (283–304), Christian martyr. She is the patron saint of the city of Syracuse (Sicily)
Giuseppe Moscati (1880–1927), doctor, scientific researcher, and university professor noted both for his pioneering work in biochemistry and for his piety
 Philip Neri (1515–1595), priest. The founder of the Congregation of the Oratory, a congregation of secular priests and clerics
Nicholas of Tolentino (1246–1305), known as the Patron of Holy Souls, was an Italian saint and mystic.
 Pio of Pietrelcina (1887–1968), Capuchin priest. He is renowned among Roman Catholics as one of the Church's modern stigmatists
 Rita of Cascia (1381–1457), Augustinian nun
 Saint Rosalia (1130–1166), hermitess, greatly venerated at Palermo and in the whole of Sicily of which she in patroness
Rose of Viterbo (1233–1251), she spent her brief life as a recluse, who was outspoken in her support of the papacy.
 Roger of Cannae (1060–1129), Bishop
 Saint Valentine (3rd century AD), according to tradition, he is the patron saint of courtship, travelers, and young people
 Saint Vitus (c. 290 – c. 303), Christian saint. He is counted as one of the Fourteen Holy Helpers of the Catholic Church
Artémides Zatti (1880–1951), Salesian and noted pharmacist that emigrated to Argentina in 1897 where became well known for his ardent faith and commitment to the sick in Patagonia.

Scientists 

 Maria Gaetana Agnesi (1718–1799), linguist, mathematician and philosopher, considered to be the first woman in the Western world to have achieved a reputation in mathematics
 Archimedes (288–212 BC), mathematician, physicist, engineer, inventor, and astronomer. Developed the Archimedes principle and invented the Archimedes screw.
Roberto Assagioli (1888–1974), psychiatrist and psychologist. The founder of the healing system known as psychosynthesis
 Gjuro Baglivi (1668–1707), physician and scientist. He published the first clinical description of pulmonary edema and made classic observations on the histology and physiology of muscle
 Franco Basaglia (1924–1980), psychiatrist. He was the promoter of an important reform in the Italian mental health system, the "legge 180/78" (law number 180, year 1978)
 Agostino Bassi (1773–1856), entomologist. The first person to succeed in the experimental transmission of a contagious disease
 Ulisse Aldrovandi (1522–1605), naturalist, noted for his systematic and accurate observations of animals, plants and minerals
 Giuseppina Aliverti (1894–1982), geophysicist remembered for developing the Aliverti-Lovera method of measuring the radioactivity of water
 Giovanni Battista Amici (1786–1863), astronomer and microscopist. The inventor of the catadioptric microscope (presented at the Arts and Industry Exhibition in Milan in 1812)
 Edoardo Amaldi (1908–1989), physicist, one of the founding fathers of European space research, led the founding of the CERN, the ESRO and later the European Space Agency (ESA)
 Giovanni Arduino (1714–1795), father of Italian geology, who established bases for stratigraphic chronology by classifying the four main layers of the Earth's crust
 Silvano Arieti (1914–1981), psychiatrist and psychoanalyst long recognized as a leading authority on schizophrenia
 Gaspare Aselli (c. 1581 – 1625), physician who contributed to the knowledge of the circulation of body fluids by discovering the lacteal vessels
 Roberto Assagioli (1888–1974), psychiatrist and psychologist. The founder of the healing system known as psychosynthesis
 Amedeo Avogadro (1776–1856), chemist and physicist. The founder of the molecular theory now known as Avogadro's law.
 Fabio Badilini (born 1964), pioneer in noninvasive electrocardiography.
 Gjuro Baglivi (1668–1707), physician and scientist. He published the first clinical description of pulmonary edema and made classic observations on the histology and physiology of muscle
 Marcella Balconi (1919–1999) child neuropsychiatrist and member of the resistance during World War II. She pioneered the practice of psychoanalytic infant observation in Italy.
 Franco Basaglia (1924–1980), psychiatrist. He was the promoter of an important reform in the Italian mental health system, the "legge 180/78" (law number 180, year 1978)
 Agostino Bassi (1773–1856), entomologist. The first person to succeed in the experimental transmission of a contagious disease
 Laura Bassi (1711–1778), scientist and physics professor at the University of Bologna
 Jacopo Berengario da Carpi (c. 1460 – c. 1530), physician and anatomist who was the first to describe the heart valves
 Giulio Bizzozero (1846–1901), anatomist. He is known as the original discoverer of Helicobacter pylori (1893)
 Enrico Bombieri (born 1940), mathematician who was awarded the Fields Medal in 1974 for his work in number theory
 Claudio Bordignon (born 1950), biologist, performed the first procedure of gene therapy using stem cells as gene vectors (1992)
 Giovanni Alfonso Borelli (1608–1679), physiologist and physicist who was the first to explain muscular movement and other body functions according to the laws of statics and dynamics
 Virginia Angiola Borrino (1880–1965), physician who was the first woman to serve as head of a University Pediatric Ward in Italy
 Giacomo Bresadola (1847–1929), clergyman and a prolific and influential mycologist
 Francesco Brioschi (1824–1897), mathematician, known for his contributions to the theory of algebraic equations and to the applications of mathematics to hydraulics
 Giuseppe Brotzu (1895–1976), physician, famous for having discovered the cephalosporin (1948)
 Tito Livio Burattini (1617–1681), mathematician, in his book Misura Universale, published in 1675, first suggested the name meter as the name for a unit of length
 Nicola Cabibbo (1935–2010), physicist who reconciled these strange-particle decays with the universality of weak interactions
 Leopoldo Marco Antonio Caldani (1725–1813), anatomist and physiologist. He is noted for his experimental studies on the function of the spinal cord
 Temistocle Calzecchi-Onesti (1853–1922), physicist, invented a tube filled with iron filings, called a "coherer" (1884)
 Tommaso Campailla (1668–1740), physician, philosopher and poet, inventor of "vapour stovens" that he used to fight syphilis rheumatism
 Giuseppe Campani (1635–1715), optician and astronomer who invented a lens-grinding lathe
 Stanislao Cannizzaro (1826–1910), chemist, in 1858 put an end to confusion over values to be attributed to atomic weights, using Avogadro's hypothesis
 Federico Capasso (born 1949), physicist, one of the inventors of the quantum cascade laser (QCL) in 1994
 Mario Capecchi (born 1937), molecular geneticist, famous for having contribution to development of "knockout mice" (1989)
 Gerolamo Cardano (1501–1576), mathematician and physician; initiated the general theory of cubic and quartic equations. He emphasized the need for both negative and complex numbers
 Antonio Cardarelli (1831–1926), physician remembered for describing Cardarelli's sign
 Antonio Carini (1872–1950), physician and bacteriologist who discovered Pneumocystis carinii, which is responsible for recurrent pneumonia in patients with AIDS
 Francesco Carlini (1783–1862), astronomer. Worked in the field of celestial mechanics, improved the theory of the motion of the Moon
 Giovanni Caselli (1815–1891), physicist, inventor of the pantelegraph (1861)
 Giovanni Domenico Cassini (1625–1712), mathematician, astronomer, engineer and astrologer who was the first to observe four of Saturn's moons
 Bonaventura Cavalieri (1598–1647), mathematician. He invented the method of indivisibles (1635) that foreshadowed integral calculus
 Luigi Luca Cavalli-Sforza (1922–2018), population geneticist, currently teaching since 1970 as emeritus professor at Stanford University. One of the most important geneticists of the 20th century
Andrea Cavalleri (born 1969), physicist who specializes in optical science. Founder of the Max Planck Institute for the Structure and Dynamics of Matter. Pprofessor at the University of Oxford. In 2018 was awarded with the Frank Isakson Prize
 Tiberius Cavallo (1749–1809), physicist and natural philosopher who wrote on the early experiments with electricity. He was known contemporaneously as the inventor of Cavallo's multiplier
 Ugo Cerletti (1877–1963), neurologist, co-inventor with Lucio Bini, of the method of electroconvulsive therapy in psychiatry
 Vincenzo Cerulli (1859–1927), astronomer. The author of the idea that the canali are just a special kind of optical illusion
 Andrea Cesalpino (1519–1603), physician, philosopher and botanist, produced the first scientific classification of plants and animals by genera and species
 Ernesto Cesàro (1859–1906), mathematician. In 1880 he developed methods of finding the sum of divergent series. Cesàro made important contributions to intrinsic geometry
 Giacinto Cestoni (1637–1718), naturalist, studied fleas and algae, and showed that scabies is provoked by Sarcoptes scabiei (1689)
 Vincenzo Chiarugi (1759–1820), physician who introduced humanitarian reforms to the psychiatric hospital care of people with mental disorders
 Agostino Codazzi (1793 - 1859), soldier, scientist, geographer, cartographer
 Realdo Colombo (c. 1516 – 1559), one of the first anatomists in the Western world to describe pulmonary circulation
 Orso Mario Corbino (1876–1937), physicist and politician, discovered modulation calorimetry and Corbino effect, a variant of the Hall effect
 Alfonso Giacomo Gaspare Corti (1822–1876), anatomist, known for his discoveries on the anatomical structure of the ear
 Domenico Cotugno (1736–1822), physician. He discovered albuminuria (about a half century before Richard Bright) and was also one of the first scientists to identify urea in human urine
 Leon Croizat (1894–1982), scholar and botanist who developed an orthogenetic synthesis of evolution of biological form over space, in time, which he called panbiogeography
 Alessandro Cruto (1847–1908), inventor who improved on Thomas Alva Edison incandescent light bulb with carbon filament (1881)
 Lea Del Bo Rossi (1903–1978), medical researcher who found a staining method based on a Coz-silver impregnation technique
 Bruno de Finetti (1906–1985), probabilist, statistician and actuary, noted for the "operational subjective" conception of probability
 Annibale de Gasparis (1819–1892), astronomer, his first asteroid discovery was 10 Hygiea in 1849. Between 1850 and 1865, he discovered eight more asteroids
 Ennio de Giorgi (1928–1996), mathematician. He brilliantly resolved the 19th Hilbert problem. Today, this contribution is known as the De Giorgi-Nash Theorem
 Mondino de Liuzzi (c. 1270 – 1326), physician and anatomist whose Anathomia corporis humani (MS. 1316; first printed in 1478) was the first modern work on anatomy
 Francesco de Vico (1805–1848), astronomer. He discovered a number of comets, including periodic comets 54P/de Vico-Swift-NEAT and 122P/de Vico
 Giambattista della Porta (c. 1535 – 1615), scholar and polymath, known for his work Magia Naturalis (1558), which dealt with alchemy, magic, and natural philosophy
 Ulisse Dini (1845–1918), mathematician and politician whose most important work was on the theory of functions of real variables
 Eustachio Divini (1610–1685), physician and astronomer; maker of clocks and lenses (1646), innovative compound microscope (1648)
 Giovanni Battista Donati (1826–1873), astronomer. He becomes one of the first to systematically adapt the new science of spectroscopy to astronomy
 Giovanni Dondi dell'Orologio (1330–1388), doctor and clock-maker at Padua, son of Jacopo Dondi, builder of the Astrarium
 Jacopo Dondi dell'Orologio (1293–1359), doctor and clock-maker at Padua, father of Giovanni
 Angelo Dubini (1813–1902), physician who identified Ancylostoma duodenale (1838)
 Girolamo Segato (1792–1836), Egyptologist and anatomist, best known for his unique work in the petrifaction of human cadavers.
 Renato Dulbecco (1914–2012), virologist, known for his brilliant work with two viruses that can transform animal cells into a cancer-like state in the test tube
 Federigo Enriques (1871–1946), mathematician, known principally as the first to give a classification of algebraic surfaces in birational geometry
Paolo Enriques (1878–1932), zoologist of Padua University.
Carlo Erba (1811-1888), pharmacologist, chemist and entrepreneur, founder of the pharmaceutical company of the same name.
 Vittorio Erspamer (1909–1999), pharmacologist and chemist, famous for having discovered the serotonin (1935) and octopamine (1948)
 Bartolomeo Eustachi (1500 or 1514–1574), anatomist. He described many structures in the human body, including the Eustachian tube of the ear
 Francesco Faà di Bruno (1825–1888), mathematician, known for the Faà di Bruno formula (1855, 1857)
 Hieronymus Fabricius (1537–1619), anatomist and surgeon, called the founder of modern embryology
 Gabriele Falloppio (1523–1562), anatomist and physician. His important discoveries include the fallopian tubes, leading from uterus to ovaries
 Enrico Fermi (1901–1954), physicist, constructed the world's first nuclear reactor (1942), initiated the atomic age
 Lodovico Ferrari (1522–1565), mathematician, famous for having discovered the solution of the general quartic equation
 Galileo Ferraris (1847–1897), physicist and electrical engineer, noted for the discovery of the rotating magnetic field, basic working principle of the induction motor
 Amarro Fiamberti (10 September 1894 – 1970), psychiatrist who first performed a transorbital lobotomy (by accessing the frontal lobe of the brain through the orbits) in 1937
 Leonardo Fibonacci (c. 1170 – c. 1250), mathematician, eponym of the Fibonacci number sequence. He is considered to be the most talented Western mathematician of the Middle Ages.
 Quirico Filopanti (1812–1894), mathematician and politician. In his book Miranda! (1858), he was the first to propose universal time and worldwide standard time zones 21 years before Sandford Fleming
Giovanni Fontana (1395 – 1455),  physician and engineer
 Carlo Forlanini (1847–1918), physician, inventor of artificial pneumothorax (1882) for treatment of pulmonary tuberculosis
 Carlo Fornasini (1854–1931), micropalaeontologist who studied Foraminifera
 Girolamo Fracastoro (1478–1553), physician and scholar, the first to state the germ theory of infection and is regarded as the founder of scientific epidemiology
 Guido Fubini (1879–1943), mathematician, eponym of Fubini's theorem in measure theory
 Galileo Galilei (1564–1642), physicist and astronomer. The founder of modern science who accurately described heliocentric Solar System
 Luigi Galvani (1737–1798), physician and physicist, noted for his discovery of animal electricity
 Agostino Gemelli (1878–1959), physician, psychologist, and priest, founder of a university and eponym of the Agostino Gemelli University Polyclinic
 Luca Ghini (1490–1556), physician and botanist, best known as the creator of the first recorded herbarium and founder of the world's first botanical garden
 Riccardo Giacconi (1931–2018), astrophysicist, called the father of X-ray astronomy
 Clelia Giacobini (1931–2010), microbiologist, a pioneer of microbiology applied to conservation-restoration
 Corrado Gini (1884–1965), statistician, demographer and sociologist, developer of Gini coefficient
 Camillo Golgi (1843–1926), histologist noted for work on the structure of the nervous system and for his discovery of Golgi apparatus (1897)
 Luigi Guido Grandi (1671–1742), philosopher, mathematician and engineer, known for studying the rose curve, a curve which has the shape of a petalled flower, and for Grandi's series
 Giovanni Battista Grassi (1854–1925), zoologist who discovered that mosquitoes were responsible for transmitting malaria between humans
 Francesco Maria Grimaldi (1618–1663), physicist and mathematician, noted for his discoveries in the field of optics, he was the first to describe the diffraction of light
 Nicola Guarino (born 1954), scientist, co-inventor with Chris Welty, of the OntoClean, the first methodology for formal ontological analysis
 Guido da Vigevano (c. 1280 – c. 1349), physician and inventor who became one of the first writers to include illustrations in a work on anatomy
 Giovanni Battista Hodierna (1597–1660), astronomer. He was one of the first to create a catalog of celestial objects with a telescope
 Arturo Issel (1842–1922), geologist, palaeontologist, malacologist and archaeologist. He is noted for first defining the Tyrrhenian Stage (1914)
 Joseph-Louis Lagrange (1736–1813), Italian-French who made major contributions to mathematics, astronomics and physics
 Giovanni Maria Lancisi (1654–1720), clinician and anatomist who is considered the first modern hygienist
 Rita Levi-Montalcini (1909–2012), neurologist, famous for having discovered the nerve growth factor (NGF)
 Aloysius Lilius (c. 1510 – 1576), astronomer and physician. The principal author of the Gregorian Calendar (1582)
Cesare Lombroso (1835–1909), criminologist, phrenologist, physician, and founder of the Italian School of Positivist Criminology
 Salvador Luria (1912–1991), microbiologist. He shared a 1969 Nobel Prize for investigating the mechanism of viral infection in living cells
 Giovanni Antonio Magini (1555–1617), astronomer, astrologer, cartographer and mathematician, known for his reduced size edition of Ptolemy's Geographiae (1596)
 Ettore Majorana (1906–1938), theoretical physicist. He is noted for the eponymous Majorana equation
 Marcello Malpighi (1628–1694), physician and biologist. He is regarded as the founder of microscopic anatomy and may be regarded as the first histologist
 Massimo Marchiori (?–?), computer scientist who made major contributions to the development of the World Wide Web. He was also the creator of HyperSearch
 Guglielmo Marconi (1874–1937), physicist, credited as the inventor of radio, often called the father of wireless communication and technology (1896)
 Philip Mazzei (1730–1816), physician, merchant and author, ardent supporter of the American Revolution, and correspondent of Thomas Jefferson
 Fulvio Melia (born 1956), writer and astrophysicist; author of Electrodynamics (2001), The Edge of Infinity. Supermassive Black Holes in the Universe (2003), and High-Energy Astrophysics (2009)
 Macedonio Melloni (1798–1854), physicist, demonstrated that radiant heat has similar physical properties to those of light
 Giuseppe Mercalli (1850–1914), volcanologist and seismologist, inventor of the Mercalli intensity scale (1902)
 Franco Modigliani (1918–2003), economist and educator who received the Nobel Prize for Economics in 1985 for his work on household savings and the dynamics of financial markets
 Geminiano Montanari (1633–1687), astronomer. Today, it is better known for his discovery of the variability of the star Algol (c. 1667)
 Maria Montessori (1870–1952), physician and educator. The innovative educational method that bears her name (1907) is now spread in 22,000 schools in at least 110 countries worldwide
 Giovanni Battista Morgagni (1682–1771), anatomist, called the founder of pathologic anatomy
 Angelo Mosso (1846–1910), physiologist who created the first crude neuroimaging technique
 Giulio Natta (1903–1979), chemist, famous for having discovered isotactic polypropylene (1954) and polymers (1957). He won a Nobel Prize in 1963 with Karl Ziegler for work on catalisys of high polymers. 
 Adelchi Negri (1876–1912), pathologist and microbiologist who identified what later became known as Negri bodies (1903) in the brains of animals and humans infected with the rabies virus
 Leopoldo Nobili (1784–1835), physicist, designed the first precision instrument for measuring electric current (1825)
 Giuseppe Occhialini (1907–1993), physicist, contributed to the discovery of the pion or pi-meson decay in 1947, with César Lattes and Cecil Frank Powell
 Barnaba Oriani (1752–1832), astronomer. Great scholar of orbital theories
 Filippo Pacini (1812–1883), anatomist who isolated the Vibrio cholerae (1854) ; the bacteria that causes cholera
 Antonio Pacinotti (1841–1912), physicist, inventor of the dynamo (1858) and electric motor (1858)
 Luca Pacioli (1446/7–1517), mathematician and founder of accounting. He popularized the system of double bookkeeping for keeping financial records and is often known as the father of modern accounting
 Ferdinando Palasciano (1815–1891), physician and politician, considered one of the forerunners of the foundation of the Red Cross
 Luigi Palmieri (1807–1896), physicist and meteorologist, inventor of the mercury seismometer
 Pier Paolo Pandolfi (born 1963), geneticist, discovered the genes underlying acute promyelocytic leukaemia (APL)
Enzo Paoletti (1943–2018), virologist who developed the technology to express foreign antigens in vaccinia and other poxviruses.
 Vilfredo Pareto (1848–1923), engineer, sociologist, economist, and philosopher, eponym of Pareto distribution, Pareto efficiency, Pareto index and Pareto principle
 Giorgio Parisi (born 1948), theoretical physicist, called the father of the modern field of chaos theory
 Emanuele Paternò (1847–1935), chemist, discoverer of the Paternò–Büchi reaction (1909)
 Giuseppe Peano (1858–1932), mathematician and a founder of symbolic logic whose interests centred on the foundations of mathematics and on the development of a formal logical language
 Gaetano Perusini (1879–1915), physician, remembered for his contribution to the description of Alzheimer's
 Giuseppe Piazzi (1746–1826), mathematician and astronomer who discovered (1 January 1801) and named the first asteroid, or "minor planet", Ceres
 Raffaele Piria (1814–1865), chemist. The first to successfully synthesize salicylic acid (1839); the active ingredient in aspirin
 Giovanni Antonio Amedeo Plana (1781–1864), astronomer and mathematician. The founder of the Observatory of Turin
 Giulio Racah (1909–1965), Italian-Israeli mathematician and physicist; Acting President of the Hebrew University of Jerusalem
Antonio Raimondi (1826 – 1890), geographer and scientist
Franco Rasetti (1901–2001), physicist, paleontologist and botanist. Together with Enrico Fermi, he discovered key processes leading to nuclear fission but refused to work on the Manhattan Project on moral grounds
 Bernardino Ramazzini (1633–1714), physician, considered a founder of occupational medicine
 Francesco Redi (1626–1697), physician who demonstrated that the presence of maggots in putrefying meat does not result from spontaneous generation but from eggs laid on the meat by flies
 Jacopo Riccati (1676–1754), mathematician, known in connection with his problem, called Riccati's equation, published in the Acla eruditorum (1724)
 Matteo Ricci (1552–1610), missionary to China, mathematician, linguist and published the first Chinese edition of Euclid's Elements
 Gregorio Ricci-Curbastro (1853–1925), mathematician, inventor of tensor analysis collaborator with Tullio Levi-Civita
 Giovanni Battista Riccioli (1598–1671), astronomer, devised the system for the nomenclature of lunar features that is now the international standard
 Augusto Righi (1850–1920), physicist who played an important role in the development of electromagnetism
 Scipione Riva-Rocci (1863–1937), internist and pediatrician. The inventor of the first mercury sphygmomanometer
 Rogerius (before 1140–c. 1195), surgeon who wrote a work on medicine entitled Practica Chirurgiae ("The Practice of Surgery") around 1180
 Gian Domenico Romagnosi (1761–1835), philosopher, economist and jurist, famous for having discovered the same link between electricity and magnetism
 Bruno Rossi (1905–1993), experimental physicist. An authority on cosmic rays
 Carlo Rubbia (born 1934), physicist who in 1984 shared with Simon van der Meer the Nobel Prize for Physics for the discovery of the massive, short-lived subatomic W particle and Z particle
 Paolo Ruffini (1765–1822), mathematician and physician who made studies of equations that anticipated the algebraic theory of groups
 Nazareno Strampelli (1866–1942), geneticist and agronomist, whose innovative scientific work in wheat breeding 30 years earlier than Borlaug laid the foundations for the Green Revolution
 Giovanni Girolamo Saccheri (1667–1733), philosopher and mathematician who did early work on non-Euclidean geometry, although he didn't see it as such
 Sanctorius (1561–1636), physiologist and physician. He laid the foundation for the study of metabolism
 Henry Salvatori (1901-1997), geophysicist founder of Western Geophysical an international oil exploration company  for the purpose of using reflection seismology to explore  petroleum.
 Antonio Scarpa (1752–1832), anatomist, famous for the anatomical eponyms Scarpa triangle and Scarpa ganglion of the ear
 Giovanni Schiaparelli (1835–1910), astronomer and science historian who first observed lines on the surface of Mars, which he described as canals
 Angelo Secchi (1818–1878), astronomer. He is known especially for his work in spectroscopy and was a pioneer in classifying stars by their spectra
 Emilio Segrè (1905–1989), physicist, known for his discovery of the antiproton
 Francesco Selmi (1817–1881), chemist. One of the founders of colloid chemistry
 Enrico Sertoli (1842–1910), physiologist and histologist. The discoverer of the cells of the seminiferous tubules of the testis that bear his name (1865)
 Ascanio Sobrero (1812–1888), chemist, famous for having discovered the synthesis of nitroglycerine (1846)
 Lazzaro Spallanzani (1729–1799), biologist and physiologist, called the father of artificial insemination (done at Pavia in 1784)
 Francesco Stelluti (1577–1652), polymath who worked in the fields of mathematics, microscopy, literature and astronomy; in 1625 he published the first accounts of microscopic observation
 Gasparo Tagliacozzi (1546–1599), plastic surgeon. He is considered a pioneer in the field; called the father of plastic surgery
 Niccolòa Tartaglia (1499–1557), mathematician who originated the science of ballistics
 Fabiola Terzi (born 1961), physician-scientist, known for her research on chronic kidney disease
 Vincenzo Tiberio (1869–1915), physician and researcher. He was one of many scientist to notice the antibacterial power of some types of mold before Alexander Fleming's discovery of penicillin
 Laura Bassi (1711–1778), scientist who was the first woman to become a physics professor at a European university
 Giuseppe Toaldo (1719–1797), physicist, gave special attention to the study of atmospheric electricity and to the means of protecting buildings against lightning
 Evangelista Torricelli (1608–1647), physicist and mathematician, inventor of the barometer (1643)
 Trotula (11th–12th centuries), physician who wrote several influential works on women's medicine; whose texts on gynecology and obstetrics were widely used for several hundred years in Europe
 Pellegrino Turri (1765–1828), built the first typewriter proven to have worked in 1808. He also invented carbon paper (1806)
 Carlo Urbani (1956–2003), physician. The first person to discover severe acute respiratory syndrome (SARS) in 1998
 Antonio Vallisneri (1661–1730), physician and naturalist who made numerous experiments in entomology and human organology, and combated the doctrine of spontaneous generation
 Antonio Maria Valsalva (1666–1723), professor of anatomy at Bologna. He described several anatomical features of the ear in his book, De aure humana tractatus (1704)
 Costanzo Varolio (1543–1575), remembered for his studies on the anatomy of the brain, and his description of the pons that bears his name
 Gabriele Veneziano (born 1942), theoretical physicist and a founder of string theory
 Giovanni Battista Venturi (1746–1822), physicist. He was the discoverer and eponym of Venturi effect
 Emilio Veratti (1872–1967), anatomist who described the sarcoplasmic reticulum
 Alessandro Volta (1745–1827), electricity pioneer, eponym of the volt, inventor of the electric battery (1800)
 Vito Volterra (1860–1940), mathematician and physicist who strongly influenced the modern development of calculus
 Giuseppe Zamboni (1776–1846), physicist who invented the Zamboni pile (1812); a model of dry battery
 Francesco Zantedeschi (1797–1873), physicist who published papers (1829, 1830) on the production of electric currents in closed circuits by the approach and withdrawal of a magnet
Antonino Zichichi (born 1929), nuclear physicist
 Niccolò Zucchi (1586–1670), astronomer and physicist. May have been the first to observe belts on the planet Jupiter with a telescope (on 17 May 1630), also claimed to have explored the idea of a reflecting telescope in 1616, predating Galileo Galilei and Giovanni Francesco Sagredo's discussions of the same idea a few years later.
 Giovanni Battista Zupi (c. 1590 – 1650), astronomer and mathematician. The first person to discover that the planet Mercury had orbital phases

Sculptors 

 Agostino di Duccio (1418 – c. 1481), sculptor whose work is characterized by its linear decorativeness
 Giovanni Antonio Amadeo (c. 1447 – 1522), sculptor, architect and engineer; he took part in the sculpture of the great octagonal dome of Milan Cathedral
 Bartolomeo Ammanati (1511–1592), sculptor and architect; his works, the two members of the del Monte family and the Fountains of Juno and Neptune, are generally considered his masterpieces
 Benedetto Antelami (c. 1150 – c. 1230), sculptor and architect. He is credited with the sculptural decorations of Fidenza Cathedral and Ferrara Cathedral
 Andrea di Alessandro 16th century, sculptor; responsible for the bronze candelabra in the Santa Maria della Salute church.
 Arnolfo di Cambio (c. 1240 – 1300–1310), sculptor and architect; his sculptures have a strong sense of volume that shows the influence on him of antique Roman models
 Giannino Castiglioni (1884–1971), sculptor who worked mostly in monumental and funerary sculpture (father of Achille, Livio, and Pier Giacomo Castiglioni)  
 Bartolommeo Bandinelli (1493–1560), sculptor and painter; his most famous and conspicuous sculpture is Hercules and Cacus (1527–34), a pendant to Michelangelo's David
 Renato Barisani (1918–2011), sculptor and painter
 Lorenzo Bartolini (1777–1850), sculptor; his most imposing creation is the Nicola Demidoff monument in Florence
 Benedetto da Maiano (1442–1497), sculptor and architect; whose work is characterized by its decorative elegance and realistic detail
 Gian Lorenzo Bernini (1598–1680), sculptor and architect during the Baroque period; works include Apollo and Daphne (1622–25) and Ecstasy of Saint Theresa (1647–1652)
 Umberto Boccioni (1882–1916), painter and sculptor. The leading theorist of futurist art; his sculpture, Unique Forms of Continuity in Space (1913) is generally considered his masterpiece
 Antonio Canova (1757–1822), sculptor. Leading exponent of the neoclassical school; works include Psyche Revived by Cupid's Kiss (1787–93, 1800–03)
 Benvenuto Cellini (1500–1571), goldsmith, medallist, sculptor and writer. He was one of the foremost Italian Mannerist artists of the 16th century
 Vincenzo Danti (1530–1576), sculptor, architect, and writer, born in Perugia and active mainly in Florence
 Andrea della Robbia (1435–1525), sculptor; known for Crucifixion and the Assumption of the Virgin at La Verna
 Desiderio da Settignano (c. 1430 – 1464), sculptor; his delicate, sensitive, original technique was best expressed in portrait busts of women and children
 Donatello (c. 1386 – 1466), sculptor, pioneer of the Renaissance style of natural, lifelike figures, such as the bronze statue David (c. 1440)
 Giovanni Battista Foggini (1652–1725), sculptor and architect; the foremost Florentine sculptor of the late Baroque period
 Domenico Gagini (1420–1492), sculptor. Although he worked at times in Florence and Rome, he is known for his activity in northern Italy
 Silvio Gazzaniga (1921–2016), sculptor. His major works includes FIFA World Cup Trophy, UEFA Europa League trophy and UEFA Supercup trophy
 Vincenzo Gemito (1852–1929), Italian sculptor, draughtsmen
 Lorenzo Ghiberti (1378–1455), sculptor, goldsmith and designer active in Florence
 Giambologna (1529–1608), sculptor in the mannerist style; works include Fountain of Neptune (1563–67) and The Rape of the Sabine Women (1574–80)
 Jacopo della Quercia (c. 1374 – 1438), sculptor; he is especially noted for his imposing allegorical figures for the Gaia Fountain in Siena
 Cesare Lapini (1848 – after 1890), sculptor; noted for both small marbles and larger work
 Francesco Laurana (c. 1430 – 1502), sculptor; known for his portrait busts of women, characterized by serene, detached dignity and aristocratic elegance
 Leone Leoni (1509–1590), sculptor and medalist; his most important works were kneeling bronze figures of Charles V and Philip II, with their families, for the sanctuary in the Escorial
 Tullio Lombardo (1460–1532), sculptor; he is noted for the mausoleum of Doge Pietro Mocenigo in Santi Giovanni e Paolo and for other tombs, including that of Dante at Ravenna
 Stefano Maderno (c. 1576 – 1636), sculptor. He was one of the leading sculptors in Rome during the papacy of Paul V (1605–1621)
 Giacomo Manzù (1908–1991), sculptor; known for his relief sculptures, which give contemporary dimensions to Christian themes
 Marino Marini (1901–1980), sculptor; known for his many vigorous sculptures of horses and horsemen (e.g., Horse and Rider, 1952–53)
 Arturo Martini (1889–1947), sculptor who was active between the World Wars. He is known for figurative sculptures executed in a wide variety of styles and materials
 Michelangelo (1475–1564), sculptor and painter; one of the most famous artists in history; creations include Pietà (1499) and David (1504)
 Mino da Fiesole (c. 1429 – 1484), sculptor; he is noted for his portrait busts
 Giovanni Angelo Montorsoli (c. 1506 – 1563), sculptor of the Michelangelesque school, and seems to have acted as assistant to Michelangelo
 Nanni di Banco (c. 1384 – 1421), sculptor; the classically influenced Four Crowned Martyrs (c. 1415) is considered his masterpiece
 Niccolò dell'Arca (c. 1435/1440–1494), sculptor. The Ragusa, Bari, and Apulia variants of his name suggest that he might have come from southern Italy
 Constantino Pandiani (1837–1922), marble and bronze sculptor
 Andrea Pisano (1290–1348), sculptor; his most important work, the first bronze doors of the Baptistery in Florence, was begun in 1330
 Giovanni Pisano (c. 1250 – c. 1315), sculptor, painter and architect; his most famous work is the Pulpit of St. Andrew (1301)
 Nicola Pisano (1220/1225–1284), sometimes considered to be the founder of modern sculpture
 Arnaldo Pomodoro (born 1926), sculptor; one of the most famous contemporary artists
 Guglielmo Pugi (1850-1915), sculptor based in Florence who was represented at international world's fairs
 Luca della Robbia (1399/1400–1482), sculptor, the most famous member of a family of artists. Two of his famous works are The Nativity (c. 1460) and Madonna and Child (c. 1475)
 Bernardo Rossellino (1409–1464), sculptor and architect. He was among the most distinguished Florentine marble sculptors in the second half of the 15th century
 Giuseppe Sanmartino (1720–1793), sculptor; his masterpiece in this genre is the four Virtues of Charles of Bourbon (1763–4)
 Andrea Sansovino (c. 1467 – 1529), sculptor; his statues and reliefs for church decoration, such as the Virgin and Child with St. Anne (1512) at San Agostino, were greatly admired
Adamo Tadolini (1788–1863), sculptor of the Neoclassic style
Pietro Tenerani (1789–1869), sculptor of the Neoclassic style
 Pietro Torrigiano (1472–1528), sculptor; his gilt bronze masterpiece, the tomb of King Henry VII and his queen, is preserved in Westminster Abbey
 Vecchietta (1410–1480), painter, sculptor, goldsmith, architect and military engineer. One of the most influential artists of the early Renaissance
 Alessandro Vittoria (1525–1608), sculptor. He was celebrated for his portrait busts and decorative work, much of which was created for the restoration of the Doge's Palace
 Vittorio Santoro (born 1962), Italian/Swiss artist working in sculptures, installations, audio works, works on paper, real-time activities and artist books.

Sport people 

 Giacomo Agostini (born 1942), motorcycle racer
 Fabian Aichner (born 1990), professional wrestler
 Mario Andretti (born 1940), four-time IndyCar and F1 world champion; one of only two drivers to win races in F1, IndyCar, World Sportscar Championship and NASCAR; His record includes 109 career wins on major circuits.
 Alberto Ascari (1918–1955), automobile racing driver; world champion driver in 1952 and 1953
Charles Atlas (1892–1972), bodybuilder best remembered as the developer of a bodybuilding method
Walter Avarelli (1912–1987), bridge player, a member of the famous Blue Team, with whom he won nine Bermuda Bowls and three World Team Olympiads from 1956 to 1972.
 Roberto Baggio (born 1967), footballer, Italy's all time FIFA World Cup top scorer, former winner of Ballon d’Or and FIFA World Player of the Year (1993)
 Stefano Baldini (born 1971), retired runner
 Jacques Balmat (1762–1834), mountaineer, called Le Mont Blanc, often regarded as the "Father of Alpinism"; Together with Michel-Gabriel Paccard, he completed the first ever ascent of Mont Blanc (1786)
 Marco Belinelli (born 1986), NBA player for the San Antonio Spurs
 Mario Balotelli (born 1990), footballer; 2010 European Golden Boy and Euro 2012 co-leading scorer
 Franco Baresi (born 1960), former footballer
 Andrea Bargnani (born 1985), basketball player with the New York Knicks of the National Basketball Association
 Gino Bartali (1914–2000), cyclist, won the Giro d'Italia twice (in 1936 and 1937) and the Tour de France in 1938
 Stefania Belmondo (born 1969), 10-time Olympic medalist in cross-country skiing
 Nino Benvenuti (born 1938), former boxer
 Giuseppe Bergomi (born 1963), former professional footballer
 Anton Bernard (born 1989), professional ice hockey
 Lorenzo Bernardi (born 1968), volleyball player; Elected by the FIVB "Volleyball Player of the Century" in 2001
 Matteo Berrettini (born 1996), tennis player
 Livio Berruti (born 1939), sprinter,  was the 1960 Rome Olympic 200 meter champion
 Paolo Bettini (born 1974), road racing cyclist
 Nino Bibbia (1922–2013), one of skeleton's great, Italy's first Winter Olympic gold medalist. In his illustrious career, he earned 231 golds, 97 silvers, and 84 bronzes; The World's most prestigious race is named after him
 Pierluigi Bini, rock climber
 Leonardo Bonucci (born 1987), football player
Scipione Borghese (1871–1927), aristocrat, industrialist, politician, explorer, mountain climber and racing driver winner of the Peking to Paris race in 1907
 Gianluigi Buffon (born 1978), footballer; goalkeeper.
Salvatore Burruni (1933–2004), flyweight and bantamweight boxer 
 Tony Cairoli (born 1985), eight-time Grand Prix motocross world champion; record of 144 races wins and 72 Grand Prix wins make him the second most successful in motocross history
Giuseppe Campari (1892–1933), Grand Prix motor racing driver
 Roberto Cammarelle (born 1980), former boxer
 Fabio Cannavaro (born 1973), footballer; centre back; won the FIFA World Player of the Year award in 2006.
 Primo Carnera (1906–1967), heavyweight boxing champion of the world
 Jury Chechi (born 1969), gymnast, nicknamed "The Lord of the Rings"; first athlete in the sport to win five consecutive world championships gold medals in the same event
 Pierluigi Collina (born 1960), football referee
 Deborah Compagnoni (born 1970), alpine skier; won three gold medals at the 1992, 1994 and 1998 Winter Olympics
Adolfo Consolini (1917–1969), discus thrower. He win the gold medal in London 1948 he set an Olympic record at 52.78 m. 
 Fausto Coppi (1919–1960), cyclist; successes earned him the title Il Campionissimo, or champion of champions
 Umberto De Morpurgo (1896–1961), tennis player, highest world ranking # 8, Olympic bronze (singles)
 Alessandro Del Piero (born 1974), footballer
 Frankie Dettori (born 1970), jockey
 Klaus Dibiasi (born 1947), diver, the only Olympic diver to have won three successive gold medals and the only one to win medals at four Summer Olympics
 Alessio Di Chirico (born 1989), mixed martial arts fighter
 Giuseppe Farina (1906–1966), racing driver; first Formula One World Champion
 Enzo Ferrari (1898–1988), race car driver and entrepreneur, founder of the Scuderia Ferrari Grand Prix motor racing team
 Domenico Fioravanti (born 1977), retired swimmer
 Roland Fischnaller (born 1980), snowboarder
 Giancarlo Fisichella (born 1973), former Formula One driver
 Fabio Fognini (born 1987), professional tennis player
 Danilo Gallinari (born 1988), No.6 pick in the 2008 NBA Draft, NBA player for Oklahoma City Thunder
 Maurice Garin (1871–1957), first giant of Italian cycling, known for winning the inaugural Tour de France in 1903
 Andrea Giani (born 1970), coach and retired volleyball player
 Camila Giorgi (born 1991), tennis player
 Antonio Giovinazzi (born 1993), racing driver currently competing for Alfa Romeo Racing in Formula One
 Paul Hildgartner (born 1952), luger
 Josefa Idem (born 1964), one of sprint canoeing's legends, winner of 38 international medals among Olympic Games, World and European Championships; Her eight Olympic appearances is a female record
 Christof Innerhofer (born 1984), alpine skier, won the men's Super-G at the world Alpine championships in Garmisch-Partenkirchen, Germany
 Duilio Loi (1929–2008), boxer
 Paolo Maldini (born 1968), footballer; centre back.
 Edoardo Mangiarotti (1919–2012), won more Olympic titles and World championships than any other fencer in history
Antonio Maspes(1932–2000), sprinter cyclist
Sandro Mazzola(born 1942), footballer
 Giuseppe Meazza (1910–1979), footballer
 Dino Meneghin (born 1950), basketball player
 Pietro Mennea (1952–2013), sprinter and politician; was the 1980 Moscow Olympic 200 meter champion, and also held the 200 m world record for 17 years
 Reinhold Messner (born 1944), mountaineer and explorer
 Stefano Modena (born 1963), racing driver from Italy, FIA European Formula Three Cup champion in 1986 and International Formula 3000 champion in 1987; participated in 81 Formula One Grands Prix during the years 1987–1992
 Francesco Molinari (born 1982), professional golfer
 Eugenio Monti (1928–2003), bobsledder, most successful athlete in the history of bobsled with 9 World championship gold medals and 6 Olympic medals, and first ever to receive the Pierre de Coubertin medal
 Uberto De Morpurgo (1896–1961), Austrian-born Italian tennis player
Francesco Moser (born 1951), road bicycle racer
Sandro Munari (born in 1940), race car driver strongly associated with rally icon Lancia Stratos HF won a further Monte Carlo Rally hat-trick in the 1970s, among a total of seven World Rally Championship victories.
 Carlton Myers (born 1971), basketball player
 Nedo Nadi (1894–1940), fencer; only one to win a gold medal in each of the three weapons at a single Olympic Games
Gastone Nencini (1930– 1980), road racing cyclist who won the 1960 Tour de France and the 1957 Giro d'Italia
 Alessandro Nesta (born 1976), footballer; defender
 Vincenzo Nibali (born 1984), professional road bicycle racer
 Tazio Nuvolari (1892–1953), motorcycle and racecar driver
 Patrizio Oliva (born 1959), former boxer
 Marco Pantani (1970–2004), cyclist, won both the Tour de France, cycling's premier road race, and the Giro d'Italia in 1998
 Dominik Paris (born 1989), alpine skier
 Sergio Parisse (born 1983), rugby union player
 Riccardo Patrese (born 1954), former Formula One driver
 Umberto Pelizzari (born 1965), free diver
 Felix Peselj (born 1990), World Cup Nordic combined skier
 Giorgio Petrosyan (born 1985), kickboxer
Silvio Piola (1913–1996), footballer who played as a striker
 Andrea Pirlo (born 1979), footballer
 Gianmarco Pozzecco (born 1972), basketball player, an all-around offensive talent; won, for seven years, the ranking for the top assist men in the Italian League
 Gaetano Poziello (born 1975), footballer
Gigi Riva (born 1944), footballer considered to be one of the best players of his generation, as well as one of the greatest strikers of all time
 Gianni Rivera (born 1943), former footballer
 Costantino Rocca (born 1956), most successful male golfer that Italy has produced
 Antonio Rossi (born 1968), sprint canoer who has competed since the early 1990s
 Paolo Rossi (1956–2020), footballer; is listed among Pelé's 125 all-time greatest footballers
 Valentino Rossi (born 1979), motorcycle racer; one of the most successful motorcycle racers of all time
 Clemente Russo (born 1982), boxer
 Alessio Sakara (born 1981), mixed martial arts fighter
 Alex Schwazer (born 1984), race walker
 Sara Simeoni (born 1953), high jumper; won a gold medal at the 1980 Summer Olympics and twice set a world record in the women's high jump
 Jannik Sinner (born 2001), tennis player
 Giovanni Siorpaes (1869–1909), mountaineer
 Santo Siorpaes (1832–1900), mountaineer
 Virginia Tacci (born 1566 or 1567), jockey in Siena
 Limbergo Taccola (1928–2003), footballer
 Francesco Tagliani (1914–?), footballer
 Marco Tardelli (born 1954), former football player and manager
Federico Tesio (1869–1954), breeder of Thoroughbreds for horse racing. He has been called "the only genius ever to operate in the breeding world"
 Gustavo Thoeni (born 1951), skier; His record of four overall World Cup titles in five years are exceeded only by Marc Girardelli's five
 Alberto Tomba (born 1966), alpine skier, known as Tomba la Bomba; Earned 3 Olympic gold medals and 9 World Cup trophies winning 50 events
 Francesco Totti (born 1976), footballer
 Alex Treves (1929–2020), Italian-born American Olympic fencer
 Jarno Trulli (born 1974), former Formula One driver
 Ondina Valla (1916–2006), athlete; first Italian woman to win an Olympic gold medal
Achille Varzi (1904–1948), Grand Prix driver
 Marvin Vettori (born 1993), mixed martial arts fighter
 Valentina Vezzali (born 1974), female fencer; One of only four athletes in the history of the Summer Olympic Games to have won five medals in the same individual event
 Christian Vieri (born 1973), footballer; one of the finest strikers in Europe
 Dorothea Wierer (born 1990), professional biathlete
 Alex Zanardi (born 1966), racing driver; won two CART championship titles in North America during the late 1990s
 Dino Zoff (born 1942), football goalkeeper
 Armin Zöggeler (born 1974), luger; nicknamed Il Cannibale; first Olympian ever, summer or winter, to win six consecutive medals in the same individual event; also holds a record of 10 World Cup titles and 57 victories
 Gianfranco Zola (born 1966), footballer; voted Chelsea's best player in the centenary celebrations of 2005

Writers and philosophers

Ancient and Late Antique 

 Lucius Accius (170 BC–c. 86 BC), Roman poet. Author of more than 40 tragedies with subjects taken from Greek mythology
 Livius Andronicus (c. 284 BC–c. 204 BC), founder of Roman epic poetry and drama
 Arator (480/490–?), Christian poet, his best known work, De Actibus Apostolorum, is a verse history of the Apostles
 Boethius (470/475–524), Roman scholar, Christian philosopher, and statesman, author of the celebrated De consolatione philosophiae
 Cassiodorus (490 – c. 585), historian, statesman, and monk who helped to save the culture of Rome at a time of impending barbarism
 Catullus (c. 84 BC–c. 54 BC), Roman poet whose expressions of love and hatred are generally considered the finest lyric poetry of ancient Rome
 Ennius (239 BC–169 BC), epic poet, dramatist, and satirist, the most influential of the early Latin poets, rightly called the founder of Roman literature
 Julius Firmicus Maternus (?–?), Christian Latin writer and astrologer
 Gaius Valerius Flaccus (?–c. 90), Roman poet. He wrote an eight-book epic, the Argonautica, on Jason's fabled quest for the Golden Fleece
 Venantius Fortunatus (c. 540 – c. 600), poet and bishop of Poitiers, whose Latin poems and hymns combine echoes of classical Latin poets with medieval tone
 Sextus Julius Frontinus (c. 40–103), Roman administrator and writer. His most famous work De aquaeductu, in two books written after he was appointed curator of the Roman water-supply (97)
 Aulus Gellius (c. 125–after 180), Latin author and grammarian remembered for his miscellany Attic Nights, in which many fragments of lost works are preserved
 Horace (65 BC–8 BC), Roman poet, outstanding Latin lyric poet and satirist under the emperor Augustus
 Juvenal (55/60–127), most powerful of all Roman satiric poets
 Livy (59/64 BC–AD 17), one of the great Roman historians
 Lucretius (c. 99 BC–c. 55 BC), Roman poet and philosopher known for his single, long poem, De rerum natura
 Gnaeus Naevius (c. 270 BC–c. 200 BC), second of a triad of early Latin epic poets and dramatists, between Livius Andronicus and Ennius
 Cornelius Nepos (c. 100 BC–c. 25 BC), Roman biographer. His only extant work is a collection of biographies, mostly from a lost larger work, De Viris Illustribus (on illustrious men)
 Ovid (43 BC–17 AD), Roman poet noted especially for his Ars amatoria and Metamorphoses
 Persius (34–62), Roman satirist, author of six satires, which show the influence of Horace and of Stoicism and which were imitated by John Donne and translated by John Dryden (1692)
 Petronius (d. 66 AD), reputed author of the Satyricon, a literary portrait of Roman society of the 1st century AD
 Plautus (c. 254 BC–184 BC), Roman comic dramatist, whose works, loosely adapted from Greek plays, established a truly Roman drama in the Latin language
 Pliny the Elder (23–79), Roman savant and author of the celebrated Natural History
 Pliny the Younger (61/62–c. 113), Roman author and administrator
 Sextus Propertius (55/43 BC–16 BC), elegiac poet of ancient Rome
 Gaius Musonius Rufus (1st century AD), Roman Stoic philosopher, known as the teacher of Epictetus
 Sallust (86 BC–35/34 BC), Roman historian and one of the great Latin literary stylists
 Silius Italicus (c. 26–102), Roman poet and politician. He was the author of the longest surviving Latin poem, Punica, an epic in 17 books on the Second Punic War (218–202 BC)
 Statius (c. 45–c. 96), one of the principal Roman epic and lyric poets of the Silver Age of Latin literature (18–133)
 Suetonius (69–after 122), Roman biographer and antiquarian whose writings include De viris illustribus and De vita Caesarum
 Quintus Aurelius Symmachus (c. 345–402), Roman statesman, orator and writer who was a leading opponent of Christianity
 Tibullus (c. 55 BC–c. 19 BC), Roman poet
 Marcus Terentius Varro (116 BC–27 BC), scholar and satirist, known for his Saturae Menippeae
 Marcus Velleius Paterculus (c. 19 BC–c. AD 31), Roman historian. Author of a short history of Rome which he wrote to commemorate the consulship of his friend Marcus Vinicius (AD 30)
 Virgil (70 BC–19 BC), Roman poet, known for his national epic, the Aeneid

The Middle Ages 

 Albertanus of Brescia (c. 1195 – c. 1251), Latin prose writer; known work is Liber consolationis et consilii ("The book of consolation and council")
 Dante Alighieri (1265–1321), poet; known for the epic poem The Divine Comedy
 Cecco Angiolieri (c. 1260 – c. 1312), poet who is considered by some the first master of Italian comic verse
 Anselm of Canterbury (1033–1109), founder of Scholasticism; he was one of the most important Christian thinkers of the 11th century
 Thomas Aquinas (c. 1225 – 1274), philosopher and theologian in the scholastic tradition; his most influential work is the Summa Theologica (1265–1274) which consists of three parts
 Bonaventure (1221–1274), leading medieval theologian, philosopher, minister general of the Franciscan order and cardinal bishop of Albano. He wrote several works on the spiritual life
 Boncompagno da Signa (c. 1165/1175–1240), philosopher, grammarian and historian
 Guido Cavalcanti (c. 1255 – 1300), poet, a major figure among the Florentine poets
 Gioacchino da Fiore (1130–1202), theologian, mystic and esotericist. His thoughts inspired many philosophical movements as the Joachimites and the Florians
 Dino Compagni (c. 1255 – 1324), historical writer and political figure
 Pietro d'Abano (1257–1315), physician, philosopher, and astrologer
 Bonvesin da la Riva (c. 1240 – c. 1313), poet and writer
 Francis of Assisi (1181/1182–1226), founder of the Franciscan orders of the Friars Minor
 Giacomo da Lentini (fl. 13th century), poet. He is traditionally credited with the invention of the sonnet
 Guido delle Colonne (c. 1215 – c. 1290), jurist, poet, and Latin prose writer; author of a prose narrative of the Trojan War entitled Historia destructionis Troiae (completed about 1287)
 Guido Guinizelli (c. 1230 – 1276), considered a precursor of Dante and the originator of the so-called dolce stil novo, or sweet new style
 Guittone d'Arezzo (c. 1235 – 1294), poet and the founder of the Tuscan School
 Jacobus de Voragine (1228/30–1298), archbishop of Genoa, chronicler, and author of the Golden Legend; one of the most popular religious works of the Middle Ages
 Jacopone da Todi (c. 1230 – 1306), Franciscan poet; he wrote many ardent, mystical poems and is probably the author of the Latin poem Stabat Mater Dolorosa
 Lanfranc (c. 1005 – 1089), philosopher and theologian
 Brunetto Latini (c. 1220 – 1294), philosopher, scholar and statesman; wrote, in French, Li livres dou tresor, the first vernacular encyclopedia
 Peter Lombard (c. 1100 – 1160), theologian; his philosophical work, the Four Books of Sentences, was the standard theological text of the Middle Ages
 Marsilius of Padua (1270–1342), political philosopher, whose work Defensor pacis ("Defender of the Peace"), one of the most revolutionary of medieval documents
 Matthew of Aquasparta (1240–1302), Franciscan and scholastic philosopher
 Michael of Cesena (c. 1270 – 1342), Franciscan, general of that Order, and theologian
 Thomas of Celano (c. 1200 – c. 1255), Friar Minor and poet; author of three hagiographies about Saint Francis of Assisi
 Giovanni Villani (c. 1275 – 1348), chronicler whose European attitude to history foreshadowed Humanism

Humanism and the Renaissance 
 Pietro Aretino (1492–1556), writer and satirist; known for his literary attacks on his wealthy and powerful contemporaries and for six volumes of letters
 Ludovico Ariosto (1474–1533), poet remembered for his epic poem Orlando furioso (1516)
 Pietro Bembo (1470–1547), cardinal who wrote one of the earliest Italian grammars and assisted in establishing the Italian literary language
 Francesco Berni (1497/98–1535), poet; important for the distinctive style of his Italian burlesque, which was called bernesco and imitated by many poets
 Giovanni Boccaccio (1313–1375), poet and scholar, author of De mulieribus claris, the Decameron and poems in the vernacular
 Matteo Maria Boiardo (1440/41–1494), poet whose Orlando innamorato, the first poem to combine elements of both Arthurian and Carolingian traditions of romance
 Giovanni Botero (c. 1544 – 1617), philosopher and diplomat, known for his work The Reason of State (1589)
 Luigi Da Porto (1485–1530), writer and storiographer, better known as the author of the novel Novella novamente ritrovata with the story of Romeo and Juliet, later adapted by William Shakespeare for his famous drama
 Leonardo Bruni (c. 1370 – 1444), a leading historian of his time. He wrote History of the Florentine People (1414–15); is generally considered the first modern work of history
 Giordano Bruno (1548–1600), philosopher; his major metaphysical works, De la causa, principio, et Uno (1584) and De l'infinito universo et Mondi (1584), were published in France
 Giulio Camillo (c. 1480 – 1544), philosopher; known for his theatre, described in his posthumously published work L’Idea del Theatro
Tommaso Campanella(1568 – 1639), Dominican friar, philosopher and poet. His most significant work was The City of the Sun, a utopia describing an egalitarian theocratic society where property is held in common
 Baldassare Castiglione (1478–1529), courtier, diplomat and writer, known for his dialogue The Book of the Courtier ; one of the great books of its time
 Francesco Colonna (1433–1527), author of Hypnerotomachia Poliphili.
 Cesare Cremonini (1550–1631), Aristotelian philosopher at Padua University
 Mario Equicola (c. 1470 – 1525), writer; author of Libro de natura de amore (1525) and Istituzioni del comporre in ogni sorta di rima della lingua volgare (1541)
 Marsilio Ficino (1433–1499), philosopher; his chief work was Theologia Platonica de immortalitate animae (1482), in which he combined Christian theology and Neoplatonic elements
 Francesco Filelfo (1398–1481), writer; author of pieces in prose, published under the title Convivia Mediolanensia, and a great many Latin translations from the Greek
 Veronica Franco (1546–1591), poet and high-ranking courtesan; famous in her day for her intellectual and artistic accomplishments
 Giovanni Battista Guarini (1538–1612), poet who, with Torquato Tasso, is credited with establishing the form of a new literary genre, the pastoral drama
 Francesco Guicciardini (1483–1540), historian; author of the most important contemporary History of Italy (1537–1540); the masterwork of Italian historical literature of the Renaissance
 Cristoforo Landino (1424–1498), writer; he wrote three works framed as philosophical dialogues: De anima (1453), De vera nobilitate (1469), and the Disputationes Camaldulenses (c. 1474)
 Niccolò Machiavelli (1469–1527), political philosopher and writer; known for his The Prince (written in 1513 and published in 1532); one of the world's most famous essays on political science
 Giannozzo Manetti (1396–1459), politician and diplomat; significant scholar of the early Italian Renaissance
 Girolamo Mei (1519–1594), writer; his treatise De modis musicis antiquorum (a study of ancient Greek music) greatly influenced the ideas of the Florentine Camerata
 Guidobaldo del Monte (1545–1607), mathematician, philosopher and astronomer; known for his work Mechanicorum Liber (1577)
 Gianfrancesco Straparola (1480–1557), writer, whose collection of 75 stories Le piacevoli notti contains the first known versions of many popular fairy tales. Along with Basile, he set the standards for the literary form of fairy tale
 Agostino Nifo (c. 1473 – 1538 or 1545), philosopher and commentator; his principal works are: De intellectu et daemonibus (1492) and De immortalitate animi (1518–1524)
 Marius Nizolius (1498–1576), philosopher and scholar; his major work was the Thesaurus Ciceronianus, published in 1535
 Franciscus Patricius (1529–1597), philosopher and scientist. His two great works: Discussionum peripateticorum libri XV (1571) and Nova de universis philosophia (1591)
 Petrarch (1304–1374), scholar and poet; his Il Canzoniere had enormous influence on the poets of the 15th and 16th centuries
 Alessandro Piccolomini (1508–1579), philosopher; his works include Il Dialogo della bella creanza delle donne, o Raffaella (1539) and the comedies Amor costante (1536) and Alessandro (1544)
 Giovanni Pico della Mirandola (1463–1494), scholar and Platonist philosopher; his Oration on the Dignity of Man (1486) is better known than any other philosophical text of the 15th century
 Bartolomeo Platina (1421–1481), writer and gastronomist. Author of Lives of the Popes (1479); the first systematic handbook of papal history and On honourable pleasure and health (1465); the world's first printed cookbook
 Poliziano (1454–1494), poet and philologist; among his works: Stanze per la giostra (incomplete) and Orfeo (1475)
 Pietro Pomponazzi (1462–1525), philosopher; his principal work is On the Immortality of the Soul (1516)
 Simone Porzio (1496–1554), philosopher. His principal works are: An homo bonus, vel malus volens fiat (1551) and De mente humana (1551)
 Francesco Pucci (1543–1597), philosopher; author of Forma d'una repubblica cattolica (1581)
 Luigi Pulci (1432–1484), poet; he ridiculed the heroic poems of his time in his mock epic Morgante (1478, 1483)
 Ottavio Rinuccini (1562–1621), poet, courtier and opera librettist
 Coluccio Salutati (1331–1406), philosopher, man of letters and a skilled writer; Coluccio drew heavily upon the classical tradition
 Jacopo Sannazaro (1456–1530), poet; author of Arcadia (1501–1504), first pastoral romance
 Julius Caesar Scaliger (1484–1558), scholar; author of De causis linguae Latinae (1540) and Poetics (1561)
 Sperone Speroni (1500–1588), philosopher and scholar; he was one of the central members of Padua's literary academy, Accademia degli Infiammati, and wrote on both moral and literary matters
 Torquato Tasso (1544–1595), poet, one of the foremost writers of the Renaissance, celebrated for his heroic epic poem Jerusalem Delivered (1581)
 Bernardino Telesio (1509–1588), philosopher; his chief work was De rerum natura iuxta propria principia (1565), marked the period of transition from Aristotelianism to modern thought
 Gian Giorgio Trissino (1478–1550), literary theorist, philologist, dramatist, and poet, an important innovator in Italian drama
 Lorenzo Valla (1407–1457), rhetorician, and educator who attacked medieval traditions and anticipated views of the Protestant reformers
 Lucilio Vanini (1585–1619), philosopher; author of Amphitheatrum Aeternae Providentiae Divino-Magicum (1615) and De Admirandis Naturae Reginae Deaeque Mortalium Arcanis (1616)
 Benedetto Varchi (1502/1503–1565), poet and historian; known for his work Storia fiorentina (16 vol.), published only in 1721
 Giorgio Vasari (1511–1574), writer, architect and painter, known for his entertaining biographies of artists, Le Vite de' più eccellenti architetti, pittori, et scultori italiani (1550)
 Nicoletto Vernia (1442–1499), Averroist philosopher, at the University of Padua
 Giovanni della Casa (1503–1556), poet, writer and diplomat. His Il Galateo (1558), the most celebrated etiquette book in European history, set the foundation for modern etiquette, polite behavior and manners literature

The Baroque period and the Enlightenment 
 Claudio Achillini (1574–1640), poet and jurist; one of the better known Marinisti
 Vittorio Alfieri (1749–1803), tragic poet; from 1775 to 1787, wrote 19 verse tragedies; his works include Filippo (1775), Oreste (1786) and Mirra (1786)
 Francesco Algarotti (1712–1764), philosopher and art critic; author of a number of stimulating essays on the subjects of architecture (1753), the opera (1755), and painting (1762)
 Maria Gaetana Agnesi (1718–1799), philosopher and mathematician; first woman to write a mathematics handbook and first woman as mathematics professor in a university
 Giuseppe Marc'Antonio Baretti (1719–1789), literary critic; author of Italian Library (1757)
 Giambattista Basile (c. 1575 – 1632), poet; his collection of 50 short stories Pentamerone (1634–6), provided the content later borrowed by Charles Perrault and Brothers Grimm. With Straparola, he is one of the two fathers of fairy tale tradition
 Cesare Beccaria (1738–1794), philosopher, criminologist and jurist; works include his treatise Dei delitti e delle pene (1763–4)
 Saverio Bettinelli (1718–1808), writer; author of Lettere dieci di Virgilio agli Arcadi (1758)
 Tommaso Campanella (1568–1639), Dominican philosopher and writer; remembered for his socialistic work The City of the Sun (1602)
Giacomo Casanova (1725– 1798), was author and adventurer from the Republic of Venice
 Giuseppe Lorenzo Maria Casaregi (1670–1737), jurist and advocate
 Melchiorre Cesarotti (1730–1808), poet and translator; author of Essay on the Philosophy of Taste (1785) and Essay on the Philosophy of Languages (1785)
 Elena Cornaro Piscopia (1646–1684), philosopher, first woman to graduate from a university with a doctorate
 Lorenzo Da Ponte (1749–1838), poet and librettist; his most important librettos were for Mozart: The Marriage of Figaro (1786), Don Giovanni (1787), and Così fan tutte (1790)
 Carlo Denina (1731–1813), historian; author of Delle rivoluzioni d'Italia (1769–70) and Delle revoluzioni della Germania (1804)
 Antonio Genovesi (1712–1769), writer and political; author of Disciplinarum Metaphysicarum Elementa (1743–52) and Logica (1745)
 Pietro Giannone (1676–1748), historian and jurist; his most important work was his Il Triregno, ossia del regno del cielo, della terra, e del papa ; published only in 1895
 Carlo Goldoni (1707–1793), playwright; wrote more than 260 dramatic works of all sorts, including opera
 Gasparo Gozzi (1713–1786), poet, critic and journalist. His principal writings are: Lettere famigliari (1755), Il Mondo morale (1760) and Osservatore Veneto periodico (1761)
 Giovanni Battista Guarini (1538–1612), poet and theoretician of literature; his best-known work is Il pastor fido (1590), a pastoral tragicomedy
 Scipione Maffei (1675–1755), writer and art critic; his most important works: Conclusioni di amore (1702), La scienza cavalleresca (1710) and De fabula equestris ordinis Constantiniani (1712)
 Giambattista Marino (1569–1625), poet. Founder of the school of Marinism (later Secentismo); among his principal works is L'Adone (1623), a long narrative poem
 Metastasio (1698–1782), poet and librettist; considered the most important writer of opera seria libretti. His melodrama Attilio Regolo (1750) is generally considered his masterpiece
 Ludovico Antonio Muratori (1672–1750), historian; author of Antiquitates Italicae Medii Aevi (6 vols; 1738–42) and Annali d'Italia (12 vols; 1744–49)
 Ferrante Pallavicino (1615–1644) satirist and novelist; his most important works: Baccinata ouero battarella per le api barberine (1642) and La Retorica delle puttane (1643)
 Giuseppe Parini (1729–1799), prose writer and poet; author of Dialogo sopra la nobiltà (1757) and Il giorno (4 books, 1763–1801)
 Cesare Ripa (c. 1560 – c. 1622), aesthetician and writer; author of the Iconologia overo Descrittione Dell’imagini Universali cavate dall’Antichità et da altri luoghi (1593), an influential emblem book
 Paolo Vergani (1753–1820), economist of the Papal States
 Alessandro Verri (1741–1816), novelist and reformer; author of Le avventure di Saffo poetessa di Mitilene (1782), Notti romane al sepolcro degli Scipioni (1792–1804) and La vita di Erostrato (1815)
 Pietro Verri (1728–1797), political economist and writer; his chief works are: Riflessioni sulle leggi vincolanti (1769) and Meditazioni sull' economia politica (1771)
 Giambattista Vico (1668–1744), philosopher and historian; his major theories were developed in his Scienza nuova (1725)

The 1800s 
 Giuseppe Gioacchino Belli (1791–1863), poet; he described the vast panorama of Roman society in colorful dialect
 Giovanni Berchet (1783–1851), patriot and poet; he wrote stirring patriotic ballads of a romantic type and rhymed romances, such as Giulia and Matilde
 Luigi Capuana (1839–1915), critic and novelist; among his best works are the short stories in Paesane (1894) and the novel Il marchese di Roccaverdina (1901)
 Giosuè Carducci (1835–1907), poet, winner of the Nobel Prize for Literature in 1906, and one of the most influential literary figures of his age
 Carlo Collodi (1826–1890), author and journalist, best known as the creator of the canonical piece of children's literature and world's most translated non-religious book The Adventures of Pinocchio
 Gabriele D'Annunzio (1863–1938), poet, military hero and political leader; author of Il piacere (1889), L'innocente (1892), Giovanni Episcopo (1892) and Il trionfo della morte (1894)
 Edmondo De Amicis (1846–1908), novelist and short-story writer; his most important work is the sentimental children's story Heart (1886)
 Federico De Roberto (1861–1927), writer; known for his novel I Vicerè (1894)
 Francesco de Sanctis (1817–1883), historian and literary critic; important works are his Saggi critici (1866) and his Storia della letteratura italiana (1870–71)
 Antonio Fogazzaro (1842–1911), novelist and poet; his famous Piccolo mondo antico (1896), it is considered one of the great Italian novels of the 19th century
 Ugo Foscolo (1778–1827), poet and patriot; his popular novel The Last Letters of Jacopo Ortis (1802) bitterly denounced Napoleon's cession of Venetia to Austria
 Vincenzo Gioberti (1801–1852), philosopher and political writer; his most celebrated work is Del primato morale e civile degli italiani (1843)
 Giuseppe Giusti (1809–1850), satirical poet; known for his poem, Sant’Ambrogio (c. 1846)
 Raimondo Guarini (1765–1852), archaeologist, epigrapher, poet; authored the first Oscan/Latin dictionary
 Francesco Guicciardini (1851–1915), member of the Italian cabinet
 Giacomo Leopardi (1798–1837), poet and philosopher; author of Canti (1816–37), expressing a deeply pessimistic view of humanity and human nature
 Alessandro Manzoni (1785–1873), poet and novelist; he is famous for the novel The Betrothed, generally ranked among the masterpieces of world literature
 Ippolito Nievo (1831–1861), writer and patriot; known for his novel Confessioni di un Italiano, also known as Confessioni d'un ottuagenario which was published posthumously in 1867
 Giovanni Pascoli (1855–1912), poet; his works include Carmina (in Latin, 1914), the more mystical Myricae (1891) and the patriotic Odi e inni (1906)
 Silvio Pellico (1789–1854), dramatic poet; his principal works are Francesca da Rimini (1818) and Le mie prigioni (1832)
 Antonio Rosmini-Serbati (1797–1855), religious philosopher; he is known for his work, Nuovo saggio sull’origine delle idee, published in 1830
 Emilio Salgari (1862–1911), adventure novelist for the young; creator of popular heroic figure Sandokan
 Niccolò Tommaseo (1802–1874), poet and critic; editor of a Dizionario della Lingua Italiana in eight volumes (1861–74), of a dictionary of synonyms (1830) and other works
 Achille Torelli (1841–1922), playwright
 Giovanni Verga (1840–1922), novelist; his works include Cavalleria rusticana (1880), I Malavoglia (1881), Novelle rusticane (1883), and Mastro-Don Gesualdo (1889)

The 1900s 
 Nicola Abbagnano (1901–1990), author of such books as La struttura dell'esistenza (1939). He was the first and most important Italian existentialist
 Corrado Alvaro (1895–1956), novelist and journalist; author of Gente in Aspromonte, considered by most critics to be his masterpiece
 Giulio Angioni (1939–2017), novelist and anthropologist
 Max Ascoli (1898–1978), philosopher and lawyer migrated  in United States of America
 Giorgio Bassani (1916–2000), novelist; his most acclaimed work, The Garden of the Finzi-Continis, published in 1962
 Carmelo Bene (1937–2002), actor, poet, theater director, film director and screenwriter author of One Hamlet Less, Salomè.
 Vitaliano Brancati (1907–1954), writer; in 1950 won the Bagutta Prize
Norberto Bobbio (1909– 2004), philosopher of law and political sciences and a historian of political thought.
 Gesualdo Bufalino (1920–1996), writer; his novel, Le menzogne della notte (1988) won the Strega Prize
 Dino Buzzati (1906–1972), writer, novelist and painter; his most famous work is a novel, The Tartar Steppe, published in 1940
 Italo Calvino (1923–1985), novelist; his trilogy of historical fantasies The Cloven Viscount (1952), The Baron in the Trees (1957), and The Nonexistent Knight (1959) brought him international acclaim
 Andrea Camilleri (1925–2019), writer; the creator of the popular Inspector Salvo Montalbano
 Dino Campana (1885–1932), poet, author of Canti Orfici.
 Carlo Cassola (1917–1987), neorealist novelist; known for his novel, Bébo's Girl, published in 1960
 Benedetto Croce (1866–1952), historian, humanist, and foremost Italian philosopher of the first half of the 20th century
 Erri De Luca (born 1950), poet and writer; author of Aceto, arcobaleno (1992), Tre cavalli (2000) and Montedidio (2002)
 Grazia Deledda (1871–1936), novelist. She was awarded the Nobel Prize in 1926; her best-known works are Elias Portolu (1903), Cenere (1904), and La madre (1920)
 Umberto Eco (1932–2016), novelist; internationally known for his novel The Name of the Rose (1980)
 Julius Evola (1898–1974), philosopher and social thinker; one of the leading exponents of the Hermetic tradition
 Oriana Fallaci (1929–2006), author, and political interviewer; important works are her The Rage and the Pride (2001) and The Force of Reason (2004)
 Beppe Fenoglio (1922–1963), novelist; he is known for his novel Il partigiano Johnny, which was published posthumously (and incomplete) in 1968
 Dario Fo (1926–2016), satirist, playwright, theater director, actor, and composer. He received the Nobel Prize for Literature in 1997
 Carlo Emilio Gadda (1893–1973), novelist; known novel is That Awful Mess on Via Merulana (1957)
 Francesco Gaeta (1879–1927)
Giovanni Gentile (1875-1944), idealist philosopher, politician, educator, and editor, sometimes called the “Philosopher of Fascism” 
 Natalia Ginzburg (1916–1991), novelist; known for her novels La strada che va in città (1942), È stato così (1947) and Le voci della sera (1961)
 Giovannino Guareschi (1908–1968), journalist and novelist, known as author of The Little World of Don Camillo (tr. 1950) and its sequels
José Ingenieros (1877–1925), physician, pharmacist, positivist philosopher and essayist. 
 Tommaso Landolfi (1908–1979), author and translator; most known and translated work is Racconto d'autunno (1947)
 Carlo Levi (1902–1975), writer, painter, and political journalist; known for his book, Christ Stopped at Eboli, published in 1945
 Primo Levi (1919–1987), writer and chemist; his first memoir, If This Is a Man has been described as one of the most important works of the 20th century
 Claudio Magris (born 1939), writer; author of Illazioni su una sciabola (1984), Danubio (1986), Stadelmann (1988), Un altro mare (1991) and Microcosmi (1997)
 Filippo Tommaso Marinetti (1876–1944), writer and novelist. The ideological founder of Futurism; among his works are Le Roi Bombance (1905) and Futurist Manifesto (1909)
Alda Merini (1931–2009), writer and poet. 
 Eugenio Montale (1896–1981), poet whose works, which greatly influenced 20th-century Italian literature, include Le Occasioni (1939) and Satura (1962). He won the 1975 Nobel Prize for literature
 Indro Montanelli (1909–2001), journalist and historian, known for his new approach to writing history in books such as History of Rome (1957) and History of the Greeks (1959)
 Elsa Morante (1912–1985), novelist and poet; her most acclaimed work, History, published in 1974
 Alberto Moravia (1907–1990), novelist; author of Gli indifferenti (1929) and of the anti-fascist novel, The Conformist (1951)
 Aldo Palazzeschi (1885–1974), novelist and poet; known for his novel Il codice di Perelà published in 1911
 Cesare Pavese (1908–1950), poet, novelist and translator; his major works include Il Compagno (1947), Tra Donne Sole (1948) and The Moon and the Bonfires (1949)
 Luigi Pirandello (1867–1936), writer and dramatist, winner of the 1934 Nobel Prize for Literature; known for a series of novels and the modernist play, Six Characters in Search of an Author
 Vasco Pratolini (1913–1991), writer and novelist; his most important literary works are the novels Family Diary (1947), Chronicle of Poor Lovers (1947) and Metello (1955)
 Salvatore Quasimodo (1901–1968), poet; his works include La terra impareggiabile (1958) and Dare e avere (1966). He received the Nobel Prize for Literature in 1959
 Mario Rigoni Stern (1921–2008), his major works include Il sergente nella neve (1953), Storia di Tönle (1978) and Le stagioni di Giacomo (1995)
 Gianni Rodari (1920–1980), writer and journalist; he won the Hans Christian Andersen Award in 1970
Alejandro Rossi (1932–2009), writer and philosopher
 Rafael Sabatini (1875–1950), Italian-British writer of novels of romance and adventure. He remains best known for The Sea Hawk (1915), Scaramouche (1921) and Captain Blood (1922)
Giovanni Sartori (1924–2017). political scientist who specialized in the study of democracy, political parties and comparative politics.
 Leonardo Sciascia (1921–1989), writer; author of The Day of the Owl (1961) and To Each His Own (1966)
 Filippo Scòzzari (born 1946), novelist and comic writer
Vittorio Sgarbi (born 1952), art critic, art historian, writer, politician, cultural commentator and television personality
 Ignazio Silone (1900–1978), novelist and journalist; known for his novel Fontamara (1930); was translated into 14 languages
 Italo Svevo (1861–1928), novelist; his best-known work, which has been called Italy's first modernist novel, is Zeno's Conscience (1923)
 Antonio Tabucchi (1943–2012), writer; author of Notturno Indiano (1984) and Sostiene Pereira (1994)
 Susanna Tamaro (born 1957), novelist. Known for the bestseller Va' dove ti porta il cuore (1994)
 Giuseppe Tomasi di Lampedusa (1896–1957), novelist; internationally renowned for his work, The Leopard, published posthumously in 1958
 Pier Vittorio Tondelli (1955–1991), writer; author of Altri Libertini (1980) and Dinner Party (1994)
 Federigo Tozzi (1883–1920), writer; known for his novel Con gli occhi chiusi published in 1919
 Giuseppe Ungaretti (1888–1970), poet, founder of the Hermetic movement that brought about a reorientation in modern Italian poetry
 Elio Vittorini (1908–1966), novelist; his works, among them The Twilight of the Elephant (1947) and The Red Carnation (1948), make a serious attempt to assess the Fascist experience

Other notables 
Giovanni Agnelli (1866–1945), entrepreneur. Founder of the Fiat (Fabbrica Italiana Automobili Torino) automobile company
Domenico Agusta (1907–1971), entrepreneur. CEO of the Agusta aeronautical company following the death of his father in 1927, and founded the MV Agusta motorcycle company in 1945
Franco Archibugi (1926–2020), economist and planner
Giorgio Armani (born 1934), fashion designer, socialite and businessman
Guido Barilla (born 1958), businessman, and the chairman of Barilla Group, the world's largest pasta company
Rabbi Berel Lazar (born in 1964) 	Chief Rabbi of Russia
Edoardo Bianchi (1865–1946), entrepreneur and inventor who founded the bicycle manufacturing company Bianchi in 1885 and the Italian automobile manufacturer Autobianchi
Marcel Bich (1914–1994), entrepreneur, co-founder of the worldwide famous company Bic. He created what would become the most popular and best selling pen in the World, Bic Cristal
Luciano Benetton (born 1935), businessman, co-founders of Benetton Group, the reknowed Italian fashion brand.
Bartolomeo Beretta (c. 1490 – c. 1565). known as maestro di canne (master gun-barrel maker), was ann artisan who, by 1526, had established the arms manufacturing enterprise Beretta.
Fortunato Brescia Tassano (died 1951), businessman who founded Grupo Breca, a real estate company-turned-conglomerate. He emigrated to Peru in 1889.[
Ettore Bugatti (1881–1947), automobile designer and manufacturer. Founder of the manufacturing company Automobiles E. Bugatti in 1909 in the then German town of Molsheim in the Alsace region of what is now France
Gaspare Campari (1828–1882), drinks manufacturer. In 1860 he formulated the bitter Campari. His recipe, which Campari keeps confidential, contained more than 60 natural ingredients 
Marilù Capparelli Italian lawyer at Google
Pierre Cardin (1922–1920), fashion designer. He is known for what were his avant-garde style and Space Age designs
Roberto Cavalli (born 1940), fashion designer and inventor. He is known for exotic prints and for creating the sand-blasted look for jeans. 
Luca Cordero di Montezemolo (born 1947), businessman, former Chairman of Ferrari, and formerly Chairman of Fiat S.p.A. and President of Confindustria 
Francesco Cirio (1836–1900), businessman, is credited with being one of the first in the world with developing the appertization technique in Italy
Pompeo D'Ambrosio (1917–1998), entrepreneur as financial manager of Banco Latino for the promotion of many successful Italian entrepreneurs in Venezuela.He was even co founder for Deportivo Italia, the soccer club of the Italian community in Venezuela
Giuseppe De'Longhi (born 1939), businessman and the president of De'Longhi Group
Torcuato di Tella  (1892–1948), industrialist and philanthropist migrated in Argentine
Pietro D'Onofrio (1859–1937), founder of a Peruvian brand and business dedicated primarily to the sale of confectionery products
Salvatore Falabella founder of multinational chain of department stores owned by Chilean multinational company SARA Falabella. It is the largest South American department store
Jean Marie Farina (1685–1766, perfumier migrated in Germany who created the first Eau de Cologne
Gaetano Filangieri (1752–1788), economist and state adviser; he is known for his work, The Science of Legislation (vols. 1–7; 1780–85)
Vincenzo Florio (1883–1959), entrepreneur, heir of the rich Florio dynasty.  An automobile enthusiast he is best known as the founder of the Targa Florio car racing.
Ferdinando Galiani (1728–1787), economist; he published two treatises, Della Moneta (1750) and Dialogues sur le commerce des blés (1770)
Domenico Dolce (born 1958), fashion designer and entrepreneur and co-founder of the Dolce & Gabbana luxury fashion house 
Emilio Pucci, Marquees di Barsento (1914–1992), fashion designer and politician
Gianfranco Faina, Italian professor (?–1981)
Edoardo Fendi (1904–1954), fashion designer cofounder of a fur and leather Fendi shop in Via del Plebiscito, Rome.
Salvatore Ferragamo (1898–1960), shoe designer and the founder of luxury goods high-end retailer Salvatore Ferragamo S.p.A. 
Enzo Ferrari (1898–1988), motor racing driver and entrepreneur, the founder of the Scuderia Ferrari Grand Prix and  the Ferrari automobile marque
Pietro Ferrero (1898–1949), founder of Ferrero SpA, a confectionery and chocolatier company. His company invented Nutella, a hazelnut-cream spread, which is now sold in over 160 countries
Micol Fontana (1913–2015), stylist and entrepreneur. Along with her two sisters Micol Fontana was stylist and co-founder of the Sorelle Fontana fashion house 
Nazareno Fonticoli, fashion designer creator of the Brioni Roman Style, the state-of-the-art factory introduced the concept of Prêt Couture, or ready-to-wear Haute Couture that sealed the international rise of the Brioni brand.
Stefano Gabbana (born 1962), fashion designer and co-founder of the Dolce & Gabbana luxury fashion house
Raul Gardini (1933–1993), entrepreneur. In 1980 as CEO of Ferruzzi Group led the acquisition of  Beeghin-Say SA. In 1987, bought the Montedison chemical group. In 1989 Eni and Montedison formed a joint-venture called Enimont.
Filippo Grandi (born 1957), diplomat, current United Nations High Commissioner for Refugees
Giovanni Achille Gaggia (1895-1961), inventor of the first modern steamless coffee machine on September 5, 1938, to be used commercially in his coffee bar. 
Palizzolo Gravina, baron of Ramione, 19th century heraldic writer
Guccio Gucci (1881–1953), businessman and fashion designer. He is known for being the founder of the fashion house of Gucci.
Lucia Guerrini (1921–1990), classical scholar and archaeologist
Carlo Guzzi (1889–1964), co-founder of Moto Guzzi
Andrea Illy (born 1964), businessman. He is the Chairman of illycaffè S.p.A., a family coffee business founded in Trieste in 1933
Ferdinando Innocenti (1891–1966), businessman who founded the machinery-works company Innocenti and was the creator of the Lambretta motorscooter.
Barbara Labate (brn 1970s), entrepreneur, co-founder of the successful shopping site Risparmio Super
Aldus Manutius (1449–1515), humanist, scholar, educator, and the founder of the Aldine Press
Antonio Pasin (1897–1990), industrialist founder of the Radio Flyer company, best known for making the Radio Flyer stamped steel toy wagon
Enrico Piaggio (1805–1965), industrialist took the decision to diversify his aeronautical plant into manufacturing Vespa scooters.
Charles Ponzi (1882–1949), swindler and artist in the U.S. and Canada
Darix Togni (1922–1976), circus man and actor
Francesco Antonio Broccu (1797–1882), artisan. Generally regarded as the inventor of Revolver (1833)
Alessandro Cagliostro (1743–1795), charlatan, magician, and adventurer who enjoyed enormous success in Parisian high society in the years preceding the French Revolution
Ambrogio Calepino (c. 1440 – 1510), one of the earliest Italian lexicographers, from whose name came the once-common Italian word calepino and English word calepin, for "dictionary"
Antonio Benedetto Carpano (1764–1815), distiller. Inventor of vermouth and aperitif (1786)
Bartolomeo Cristofori (1655–1731), harpsichord maker generally credited with the invention of the piano (c. 1700)
Francesco Datini (1335–1410), merchant whose business and private papers, preserved in Prato, constitute one of the most important archives of the economic history of the Middle Ages
Lorenzo de Tonti (c. 1602 – c. 1684), banker. The inventor of the system of annuities, now known as the tontine (1653)
Giuseppe Donati (1835–1925), musician. Inventor of the classical ocarina
Giovanni Falcone (1939–1992), magistrate who was specialised in prosecuting Cosa Nostra criminals. His life story is quite similar to that of his closest friend Paolo Borsellino
Rosina Ferrario (1888–1957), first Italian woman to receive a pilot's licence in January 1913
Serafino Ferruzzi (1908–1979), businessman founder of the food brand Feruuzzi Group
Andrea Fogli, product designer and interior designer
Filippo Gagliardi, entrepreneur migrated in Venezuela
Riccardo Gualino (1879–1964), business magnate and art collector. He was also a patron of business empire based on forest concessions, cargo ships, banking, manufacture of rayon, confectionery, chemicals, artificial leather and film producer.
Domenico Ghirardelli (1817–1894), chocolatier who was the founder of the Ghirardelli Chocolate Company in San Francisco, California.
Jose Greco (1918–2000), dancer and choreographer. Popularized Spanish dance in the 1950s and '60s sometimes earning him the title "the world's greatest non-Spanish Spanish dancer". The Spanish government knighted him in 1962
Johann Maria Farina (1685–1766), perfume designer and maker. Inventor of Eau de Cologne (1709)
Dino De Laurentiis (1919–2010), film producer. He produced or co-produced more than 500 films, of which 38 were nominated for Academy Awards. 
Sonia Gandhi (born 1946), Italian-born Indian politician and the president of the Indian National Congress, widow of former Prime minister Rajiv Gandhi
Ugolino della Gherardesca (c. 1220 – 1289), nobleman, whose death by starvation with his sons and grandsons is described by Dante in the Inferno (Canto XXXIII)
Vito Ippolito (born 1952),  Venezuelan naturalized Italian sportive leader, president of the Federation Internationale de Motocyclisme from 2006 to 2018
John of Montecorvino (1246–1328), Franciscan and founder of the Catholic mission in China
Angelo Moriondo (1851–1914), inventor, who is usually credited with patenting the earliest known espresso machine, in 1884
Lisa del Giocondo (1479–1542 or c. 1551), her name was given to Mona Lisa, her portrait commissioned by her husband and painted by Leonardo da Vinci during the Italian Renaissance
Giovanni Paolo Lancelotti (1522–1590), jurist
Ferruccio Lamborghini (1916–1993), automobile designer, inventor, engineer, winemaker, industrialist and businessman who created In 1963,  *Automobili Lamborghini, maker of high-end sports cars 
Luigi Lavazza (1859–1949), businessman. In 1895, he founded the Lavazza coffee company in Turin
Lokanātha (1897–1966), was known as Salvatore Cioffi before ordination, a prominent Italian Buddhist monk and missionary
Alessandro Martini (1812–1905), businessman, founder of one of the most important vermouth companies in the world, Martini & Rossi, which produces the Martini vermouth.
Enrico Mattei (1906–1962), public administrator of ENI
Vittorio Missoni (1954–2013), CEO of Missoni, the fashion house founded by his parents in 1953. He is credited with expanding Missoni into a global brand after his parents handed control to him and his two siblings, Angela and Luca, in 1996
Arnoldo Mondadori (1889-1971), entrepreneur who in 1907 founded the biggest publishing company in Italy.
Edgardo Mortara (1851–1940), priest, central figure in a controversy that arose when at the age of 6 he was forcibly taken from his Jewish parents because a domestic servant had baptized him
Aldo Notari (1932–2006), businessman was president of the International Baseball Federation from 1993 to 2006
Calogero Paparoni (1876–1958), coffee trader migrated to Venezuela
Rinaldo Piaggio (1864–1938), entrepreneur, senator, and founder of Piaggio Group
Generoso Papa (1891–1950), businessman and the owner of a chain of Italian-language newspapers in major USA cities
Carlo Ponti (1912–2007), film producer. Along with Dino De Laurentiis, he popularized Italian cinema post-World War II,
Aurelio Peccei (1908–1984), industrialist and philanthropist, co-founder of the Club of Roma
Primo Nebiolo (1923–1999), sports official, best known as president of the worldwide athletics federation IAAF from 1981 to his die in 1999. He was the ideator of the IAAF Continental Cup
Giovanni Battista Pirelli (1848–1932), founder of Pirelli, the company specialised in rubber and derivative processes 
Nina Ricci (1883–1970), fashion designer. She and her son Robert founded the fashion house Nina Ricci in Paris in 1932. It has been owned by the Spanish company Puig since 1998
Giovanni Ricordi (1785–1853), founder of Casa Ricordi
Cola di Rienzo (c. 1313 – 1354), popular leader who tried to restore the greatness of ancient Rome
Angelo Rizzoli (1889–1970); publisher and film producer
Sacco and Vanzetti case (1888–1927, 1891–1927), controversial murder trial in Massachusetts, United States, extending over seven years, 1920–27, and resulting in the execution of the defendants
Massimo Salvadori (1908–1992), historian
Girolamo Savonarola (1452–1498), Christian preacher, reformer, and martyr, renowned for his clash with tyrannical rulers and a corrupt clergy
Elsa Schiaparelli (1890–1973), fashion designer. Along with Coco Chanel, her greatest rival, she is regarded as one of the most prominent European figures in fashion between the two World Wars
Michela Schiff Giorgini (1923–1978), Egyptologist
Maria Signorelli (1908–1992), puppet master and puppet collector from Rome
Father Simpliciano of the Nativity (1827–1898), founder of the Congregation of the Franciscan Sisters of the Sacred Hearts in Santa Balbina
Calisto Tanzi (1938–2022), businessman and convicted fraudster. He founded Parmalat in 1961, after dropping out of college
Michele Taddei, leather craftsman co-founder of Botega Veneta a luxury fashion house. Its product lines include ready-to-wear, handbags, shoes, accessories, and jewelry; and it licenses its name and branding to Coty, Inc. for fragrances
Emilia Telese (born 1973), audio and visual performing artist
Augusto Odone (1933–2013, 1939–2000, 1978–2008), noted for the creation of Lorenzo's oil as a treatment to Adrenoleukodystrophy after his son, Lorenzo, was diagnosed with the rare and deadly disease.
Miuccia Prada (born 1949), fashion designer and businesswoman
Andrea Rossi (born 1950); entrepreneur known for Petroldragon, Energy Catalyzer who claims to have invented a cold fusion device.
Sergio Rossi (1935–2020), shoe designer, who founded his own reknowed world brand
Emilio Schuberth (1904–1972), fashion designer, popular in the 1940s and 1950s. Schuberth was called the "tailor of the stars"
Filippo Sindoni (1936–2007), businessman migrated in Venezuela, his activities spiked in food and media branches 
Valentino (born 1932), fashion designer, the founder of the Valentino brand and company.
Donatella Versace (born 1955), fashion designer, businesswoman, socialite, and model. In 1997, she inherited a portion of the Versace brand and became its creative director. She is currently the brand's chief creative officer. Along with her brother Gianni, she is widely credited for the supermodel phenomenon of the 1990s by casting editorial models on the runway
Gianni Versace (1946–1997), fashion designer, socialite and businessman.
Bruno Vespa (born 1944), journalist. A former director of the Rai Uno's news program TG1, founding host of the talk show Porta a Porta (English:"Door to door"), which has been broadcast without interruption on RAI channels since 1996.
Simonetta Vespucci (c. 1453 – 26 April 1476), nicknamed la bella Simonetta, Italian Renaissance noblewoman from Genoa
Giovanni Battista Vicini (1847-1900), entrepreneur migrated in Santo Domingo founder of  business family. According to Forbes Magazine, the Vicini as a whole are the wealthiest family in the Dominican Republic.
Antonio Luigi Zanussi (1890–1946), entrepreneur, founder of electrodomestic Zanuzzi Group
Paola Zancani Montuoro (1901–1987), classical archaeologist
Massimo Zanetti (born 1948), entrepreneur and former politician, owner of Segafredo, a global coffee company.
Ermenegildo Zegna (born 1955), entrepreneur and manager. He is CEO of the eponymous luxury fashion house Ermenegildo Zegna.

See also 

 List of Italian Americans
 List of people by nationality
 List of Sardinians
 List of Sicilians

References